

Deaths in May

1: Henry Cooper
1: Ted Lowe
7: Seve Ballesteros
8: Lionel Rose
9: Wouter Weylandt
13: Derek Boogaard
15: Samuel Wanjiru
17: Harmon Killebrew
27: Margo Dydek
29: Bill Roycroft

Current sporting seasons

Australian rules football 2011

Australian Football League

Auto racing 2011

Formula One
Sprint Cup
Nationwide Series
Camping World Truck Series
IRL IndyCar Series
World Rally Championship
WTTC
V8 Supercar
Formula Two
GP2 Series
GP3 Series
American Le Mans
Le Mans Series
Rolex Sports Car Series
FIA GT1 World Championship
Auto GP
World Series by Renault
Deutsche Tourenwagen Masters
Super GT

Baseball 2011

Major League Baseball
Nippon Professional Baseball

Basketball 2011

NBA
NBA Playoffs
Euroleague
EuroChallenge
France
Germany
Greece
Iran
Israel
Italy
Philippines
Commissioner's Cup
Russia
Spain
Turkey

Cricket 2011

England:
County Championship
Clydesdale Bank 40
India:
Premier League

Darts 2011

Premier League

Football (soccer) 2011

National teams competitions
UEFA Euro 2012 qualifying
2012 Africa Cup of Nations qualification
International clubs competitions
UEFA (Europe) Champions League
UEFA Europa League
UEFA Women's Champions League
Copa Libertadores (South America)
AFC (Asia) Champions League
AFC Cup
CAF (Africa) Champions League
CAF Confederation Cup
Domestic (national) competitions
Argentina
Brazil
England
France
Germany
Iran
Italy
Japan
Norway
Portugal
Russia
Scotland
Spain
Major League Soccer (USA & Canada)
Women's Professional Soccer (USA)

Golf 2011

PGA Tour
European Tour
LPGA Tour
Champions Tour

Ice hockey 2011

National Hockey League
Stanley Cup playoffs
Canadian Hockey League:
OHL, QMJHL, WHL
Memorial Cup

Motorcycle racing 2011

Moto GP
Superbike World Championship
Supersport World Championship

Rugby league 2011

Super League
NRL

Rugby union 2011

Heineken Cup
European Challenge Cup
English Premiership
Celtic League
Top 14
Super Rugby
Sevens World Series

Tennis 2011

ATP World Tour
WTA Tour

Volleyball 2011

National teams competitions
World League
Men's European League
Women's European League
Domestic (national) competitions
Puerto Rican Women's League
Iranian Men's Super League

Days of the month

May 31, 2011 (Tuesday)

Basketball
FIBA Asia Champions Cup in Pasig, Philippines: (teams in bold advance to the quarterfinals)
Group A:
KL Dragons  77–101  ASU Sports
Smart Gilas  74–64  Duhok Sports Club
Standings: Smart Gilas, ASU Sports 6 points (3 matches), Duhok Sports Club 5 (4),  Al-Ittihad Jeddah 4 (3), KL Dragons 3 (3).
Group B:
Al-Jalaa Aleppo  93–63  Al Shabab
Al-Rayyan  73–78 (OT)  Al-Riyadi Beirut
Standings: Al-Riyadi Beirut 6 points (3 matches),  Mahram Tehran, Al-Rayyan Sports 5 (3), Al-Jalaa Aleppo 4 (3), Al-Shabab Club 4 (4).
 NBA Finals (best-of-7 series):
Game 1 in Miami: Miami Heat 92, Dallas Mavericks 84. Heat lead series 1–0.

Ice hockey
The NHL's Atlanta Thrashers have been sold to a Winnipeg-based group that will move the team to that city for the 2011–12 season. The league's owners are expected to ratify the deal at their next scheduled meeting on June 21. The move brings the NHL back to Winnipeg for the first time since the Jets left for Phoenix in 1996, and also makes Atlanta the first city to lose two NHL teams in the league's modern era.

Tennis
French Open in Paris, France, day 10:
Men's Singles:
Fourth round: Andy Murray  [4] def. Viktor Troicki  [15] 4–6, 4–6, 6–3, 6–2, 7–5
Quarterfinals:
Novak Djokovic  [2] def. Fabio Fognini  walkover
Roger Federer  [3] def. Gaël Monfils  [9] 6–4, 6–3, 7–6(3)
Women's Singles Quarterfinals:
Francesca Schiavone  [5] def. Anastasia Pavlyuchenkova  [14] 1–6, 7–5, 7–5
Marion Bartoli  [11] def. Svetlana Kuznetsova  [13] 7–6(4), 6–4

May 30, 2011 (Monday)

Basketball
FIBA Asia Champions Cup in Pasig, Philippines: (teams in bold advance to the quarterfinals)
Group A:
ASU Sports  79–69  Al-Ittihad Jeddah
Duhok Sports Club  88–76  KL Dragons
Standings:  Smart Gilas, ASU Sports 4 points (2 matches), Al-Ittihad Jeddah, Duhok Sports Club 4 (3), KL Dragons 2 (2).
Group B:
Al-Riyadi Beirut  76–73  Mahram Tehran
Al Shabab  60–78  Al-Rayyan
Standings: Mahram Tehran 5 points (3 matches), Al-Rayyan Sports, Al-Riyadi Beirut 4 (2), Al-Shabab Club 3 (3),  Al-Jalaa Aleppo 2 (2).

Cricket
Sri Lanka in England:
1st Test in Cardiff; day 5:  400 & 82 (24.4 overs);  496/5d (155 overs; Ian Bell 103*). England win by an innings & 14 runs; lead 3-match series 1–0.
Pakistan in Ireland:
2nd ODI in Belfast:  238/8 (50 overs; Paul Stirling 109);  242/5 (48.4 overs). Pakistan win by 5 wickets; win 2-match series 2–0.

Football (soccer)
UEFA Women's U-19 Championship in Italy:
Group A:
 2–1  in Imola
 4–1  in Bellaria
Group B:
 3–1  in Cervia
 1–1  in Forlì

Motorcycle racing
Superbike:
Miller World Championship round in Tooele, Utah, United States:
Race 1: (1) Carlos Checa  (Ducati 1198) (2) Jakub Smrž  (Ducati 1198) (3) Sylvain Guintoli  (Ducati 1198)
Race 2: (1) Checa (2) Leon Camier  (Aprilia RSV4) (3) Max Biaggi  (Aprilia RSV4)
Riders' championship standings (after 5 of 13 rounds): (1) Checa 195 points (2) Marco Melandri  (Yamaha YZF-R1) 134 (3) Biaggi 133

Tennis
French Open in Paris, France, day 9:
Men's Singles, fourth round:
Rafael Nadal  [1] def. Ivan Ljubičić  7–5, 6–3, 6–3
Andy Murray  [4] vs. Viktor Troicki  [15] 4–6, 4–6, 6–3, 6–2 (match suspended)
Robin Söderling  [5] def. Gilles Simon  [18] 6–2, 6–3, 7–6(5)
Gaël Monfils  [9] def. David Ferrer  [7] 6–4, 2–6, 7–5, 1–6, 8–6
Juan Ignacio Chela  def. Alejandro Falla  4–6, 6–2, 1–6, 7–6(5), 6–2
Women's Singles, fourth round:
Victoria Azarenka  [4] def. Ekaterina Makarova  6–2, 6–3
Li Na  [6] def. Petra Kvitová  [9] 2–6, 6–1, 6–3
Maria Sharapova  [7] def. Agnieszka Radwańska  [12] 7–6(4), 7–5
Andrea Petkovic  [15] def. Maria Kirilenko  [25] 6–2, 2–6, 6–4

May 29, 2011 (Sunday)

Auto racing
Formula One:
 in Monte Carlo, Monaco: (1) Sebastian Vettel  (Red Bull-Renault) (2) Fernando Alonso  (Ferrari) (3) Jenson Button  (McLaren-Mercedes)
Drivers' championship standings (after 6 of 19 races): (1) Vettel 143 points (2) Lewis Hamilton  (McLaren-Mercedes) 85 (3) Mark Webber  (Red Bull-Renault) 79
Sprint Cup Series:
Coca-Cola 600 in Concord, North Carolina: (1)  Kevin Harvick (Chevrolet; Richard Childress Racing) (2)  David Ragan (Ford; Roush Fenway Racing) (3)  Joey Logano (Toyota; Joe Gibbs Racing)
Drivers' championship standings (after 12 of 36 races): (1)  Carl Edwards (Ford; Roush Fenway Racing) 445 points (2) Harvick 409 (3)  Jimmie Johnson (Chevrolet; Hendrick Motorsports) 408
IndyCar Series:
95th Indianapolis 500 Mile Race in Speedway, Indiana: (1) Dan Wheldon  (Bryan Herta Autosport) (2) J. R. Hildebrand  (Panther Racing) (3) Graham Rahal  (Chip Ganassi Racing)
Wheldon becomes the 18th driver to win multiple Indianapolis 500 races, assuming the lead on the final straight after Hildebrand crashes in the final corner.
Drivers' championship standings (after 5 of 17 races): (1) Will Power  (Team Penske) 194 points (2) Dario Franchitti  (Chip Ganassi Racing) 178 (3) Oriol Servià  (Newman/Haas Racing) 152
World Rally Championship:
Rally Argentina in Villa Carlos Paz, Argentina: (1) Sébastien Loeb /Daniel Elena  (Citroën DS3 WRC) (2) Mikko Hirvonen /Jarmo Lehtinen  (Ford Fiesta RS WRC) (3) Sébastien Ogier /Julien Ingrassia  (Citroën DS3 WRC)
Drivers' championship standings (after 6 of 13 rallies): (1) Loeb 126 points (2) Hirvonen 113 (3) Ogier 96

Badminton
Sudirman Cup in Qingdao, China:
Final:  3–0 
China win the Cup for the fourth successive time and eighth time overall.

Basketball
FIBA Asia Champions Cup in Pasig, Philippines:
Group A:
Al-Ittihad Jeddah  83–75  Duhok Sports Club
KL Dragons  64–95  Smart Gilas
Standings: Smart Gilas 4 points (2 matches), Al-Ittihad Jeddah 3 (2),  ASU Sports 2 (1), Duhok Sports Club 2 (2), KL Dragons 1 (1).
Group B:
Al-Rayyan  90–67  Al-Jalaa Aleppo
Mahram Tehran  90–73  Al Shabab
Standings: Mahram Tehran 4 points (2 matches), Al-Rayyan Sports,  Al-Riyadi Beirut 2 (1), Al-Shabab Club, Al-Jalaa Aleppo 2 (2).
 National Basketball League Finals, game 2: Levski Sofia 73–88 Lukoil Academic. Lukoil Academic win series 2–0.
Lukoil Academic win the title for the ninth successive time and 21st time overall.

Cricket
Sri Lanka in England:
1st Test in Cardiff; day 4:  400;  491/5 (153 overs; Jonathan Trott 203, Alastair Cook 133). England lead by 91 runs with 5 wickets remaining in the 1st innings.

Cycling
Grand Tours:
Giro d'Italia, Stage 21:  David Millar  30' 13"  Alex Rasmussen  + 7"  Alberto Contador   + 36"
Final general classification: (1) Contador  84h 05' 14" (2) Michele Scarponi  + 6' 10" (3) Vincenzo Nibali  + 6' 56"
Contador wins the Giro for the second time, and his sixth Grand Tour.
UCI World Tour standings (after 14 of 27 races): (1) Philippe Gilbert  356 points (2) Contador 349 (3) Scarponi 348

Equestrianism
Show Jumping – CSIO Piazza di Siena in Rome (CSIO 5*):
Grand Prix:  Eric Lamaze  on Hickstead  Michael Whitaker  on Amai  Jeroen Dubbeldam  on Simon

Football (soccer)
Nations Cup in Dublin, Republic of Ireland:  1–0 
Final standings: Republic of Ireland 9 points, Scotland 6 points,  3,  0.
The Republic of Ireland becomes the inaugural champion.
Friendly international: (top 10 in FIFA World Rankings)
(4)  2–1 (7) 
CAF Confederation Cup Play-off for group stage, first leg:
ZESCO United  1–0  Maghreb de Fès
Inter Luanda  3–0  Difaa El Jadida
ASEC Mimosas  4–0  1º de Agosto
Club Africain  3–0  Sofapaka
 Austrian Cup Final in Vienna: Ried 2–0 Austria Lustenau
Ried win the Cup for the second time.
 Belarusian Cup Final in Minsk: Gomel 2–0 Neman Grodno
Gomel win the Cup for the second time.
 Coppa Italia Final in Rome: Internazionale 3–1 Palermo
Internazionale win the Cup for the second successive time, and seventh time overall.
 Luxembourg Cup Final in Luxembourg City: F91 Dudelange 0–1 FC Differdange 03
Differdange win the Cup for the second successive time.
 Swiss Cup Final in Basel: Neuchâtel Xamax 0–2 FC Sion
Sion win the Cup for the twelfth time.

Golf
Senior majors:
Senior PGA Championship presented by KitchenAid in Louisville, Kentucky:
Leaderboard after final round: (T1) David Eger  & Tom Watson  278 (−10) (3) Kiyoshi Murota  279 (−9)
Playoff: Watson 4 (−1) def. Eger 5 (E)
Watson wins his second Senior PGA title, his sixth senior major and 14th Champions Tour title. The 61-year-old Hall of Famer also becomes the oldest winner of a senior major since the creation of the Champions Tour in 1980.
PGA Tour:
HP Byron Nelson Championship in Irving, Texas:
Winner: Keegan Bradley  277 (−3)PO
Bradley defeats Ryan Palmer  on the first playoff hole to win his first PGA Tour title.
European Tour:
BMW PGA Championship in Virginia Water, Surrey, England:
Winner: Luke Donald  278 (−6)PO
Donald defeats Lee Westwood  on the first playoff hole to win his fifth European Tour title, and replaces Westwood at the top of the world rankings.
LPGA Tour:
HSBC Brazil Cup in Rio de Janeiro, Brazil:
Winner: Mariajo Uribe  135 (−9)
In this unofficial event, Uribe wins her first professional title.

Gymnastics
European Rhythmic Gymnastics Championships in Minsk, Belarus:
Senior hoop:  Yevgeniya Kanayeva  29.450 points  Daria Kondakova  29.025  Liubov Charkashyna  28.200
Senior ball:  Charkashyna 28.450 points  Kanayeva 28.350  Daria Dmitrieva  27.575
Senior clubs:  Charkashyna 28.300 points  Neta Rivkin  27.900  Alina Maksimenko  27.525
Senior ribbon:  Kanayeva 29.275 points  Kondakova 29.075  Silviya Miteva  27.825
Junior groups:   27.100 points   26.500   25.825

Handball
Champions League Final four in Cologne, Germany:
Third place game: Rhein-Neckar Löwen  31–33  HSV Hamburg
Final: FC Barcelona  27–24  BM Ciudad Real
Barcelona win the title for the eighth time.

Ice hockey
Memorial Cup in Mississauga, Ontario:
Final: Saint John Sea Dogs 3, Mississauga St. Michael's Majors 1
The Sea Dogs win the Cup for the first time, becoming the sixth QMJHL team to win the tournament.

Rugby union
IRB Sevens World Series:
Edinburgh Sevens at Murrayfield:
Shield:  17–12 
Bowl:  14–21 
Plate:  26–14 
Cup:  35–36 
Final standings: (1)  166 points (2) South Africa 140 (3)  127
New Zealand win the title for the ninth time.

Tennis
French Open in Paris, France, day 8:
Men's Singles, fourth round:
Novak Djokovic  [2] def. Richard Gasquet  [13] 6–4, 6–4, 6–2
Roger Federer  [3] def. Stanislas Wawrinka  [14] 6–2, 6–3, 7–5
David Ferrer  [7] vs. Gaël Monfils  [9] 4–6, 6–2, 5–7, 2–0 (match suspended)
Fabio Fognini  def. Albert Montañés  4–6, 6–4, 3–6, 6–3, 11–9
Women's Singles, fourth round:
Anastasia Pavlyuchenkova  [14] def. Vera Zvonareva  [3] 7–6(4), 2–6, 6–2
Francesca Schiavone  [5] def. Jelena Janković  [10] 6–3, 2–6, 6–4
Marion Bartoli  [11] def. Gisela Dulko  7–5, 1–0 retired
Svetlana Kuznetsova  [13] def. Daniela Hantuchová  [28] 7–6(6), 3–6, 6–2

Volleyball
FIVB World League, Week 1:
Pool B:  3–2 
Standings (after 2 matches):  6 points, Bulgaria, Germany 3,  0.
Pool C:
 3–1 
 3–0 
Standings (after 2 matches): Portugal 5 points, Serbia, Argentina 3, Finland 1.
Pool D:
 1–3 
 0–3 
Standings (after 2 matches): Italy 6 points, South Korea, Cuba 3, France 0.
Men's European Volleyball League, Leg 1:
Pool A:
 1–3 
 0–3 
Standings (after 2 matches): Slovenia 6 points, Croatia 4, Great Britain 2, Belgium 0.
Pool C:  3–0 
Standings (after 2 matches): , Turkey, Belarus 3 points.
Women's European Volleyball League, Leg 1:
Pool C:  3–0 
Standings (after 2 matches): , Turkey 6 points, Belarus,  0.

May 28, 2011 (Saturday)

Auto racing
Nationwide Series:
Top Gear 300 in Concord, North Carolina: (1)  Matt Kenseth (Ford; Roush Fenway Racing) (2)  Carl Edwards (Ford; Roush Fenway Racing) (3)  Kyle Busch (Toyota; Joe Gibbs Racing)
Drivers' championship standings (after 13 of 34 races): (1)  Elliott Sadler (Chevrolet; Kevin Harvick Incorporated) 452 points (2)  Ricky Stenhouse Jr. (Ford; Roush Fenway Racing) 451 (3)  Reed Sorenson (Chevrolet; Turner Motorsports) 450

Badminton
Sudirman Cup in Qingdao, China:
Semifinals:
 3–1 
 3–1

Basketball
FIBA Asia Champions Cup in Pasig, Philippines:
Group A:
Duhok Sports Club  66–74  ASU Sports
Smart Gilas  101–69  Al-Ittihad Jeddah
Group B:
Al-Jalaa Aleppo  59–86  Mahram Tehran
Al Shabab  90–109  Al-Riyadi Beirut

Cricket
Sri Lanka in England:
1st Test in Cardiff; day 3:  400;  287/2 (90 overs; Alastair Cook 129*, Jonathan Trott 125*). England trail by 113 runs with 8 wickets remaining in the 1st innings.
Pakistan in Ireland:
1st ODI in Belfast:  96 (20/36 overs);  97/3 (27.3 overs). Pakistan win by 7 wickets (D/L); lead 2-match series 1–0.
Indian Premier League Playoff:
Final in Chennai: Chennai Super Kings 205/5 (20 overs); Royal Challengers Bangalore 147/8 (20 overs). Chennai Super Kings win by 58 runs.
The Super Kings retain their title, and become the first team to win the title twice.

Cycling
Grand Tours:
Giro d'Italia, Stage 20:  Vasil Kiryienka  6h 17' 03"  José Rujano  + 4' 43"  Joaquim Rodríguez  + 4' 50"
General classification (after stage 20): (1) Alberto Contador   83h 34' 25" (2) Michele Scarponi  + 5' 18" (3) Vincenzo Nibali  + 6' 14"

Football (soccer)
UEFA Champions League Final in London: FC Barcelona  3–1  Manchester United
Barcelona win the tournament for the second time in three years, and fourth time overall.
Friendly women's international (top 10 in FIFA Women's World Rankings):
(6)  2–0 
CAF Champions League Special play-off in Cairo, Egypt: Wydad Casablanca  3–0  Simba
Wydad Casablanca advance to Group B in the Group stage.
CAF Confederation Cup Play-off for group stage, first leg:
ES Sétif  1–0  Kaduna United
Diaraf  1–1  JS Kabylie
 Nedbank Cup Final in Mbombela: Orlando Pirates 3–1 Black Leopards
Orlando Pirates win the Cup for the third time.

Golf
Senior majors:
Senior PGA Championship presented by KitchenAid in Louisville, Kentucky:
Leaderboard after second round: (1) Kiyoshi Murota  133 (−11) (T2) Hale Irwin  & Nick Price  137 (−7)
Leaderboard after third round: (T1) Irwin & Murota 207 (−9) (3) Tom Watson  208 (−8)

Gymnastics
European Rhythmic Gymnastics Championships in Minsk, Belarus:
Senior teams:

Handball
Champions League Final four in Cologne, Germany:
Semifinals:
Rhein-Neckar Löwen  28–30  FC Barcelona
BM Ciudad Real  28–23  HSV Hamburg

Mixed martial arts
UFC 130 in Las Vegas, United States:
Middleweight bout: Brian Stann  def. Jorge Santiago  via KO (punches)
Welterweight bout: Rick Story  def. Thiago Alves  via unanimous decision
Heavyweight bout: Travis Browne  def. Stefan Struve  via KO (superman punch)
Heavyweight bout: Frank Mir  def. Roy Nelson  via unanimous decision
Light Heavyweight bout: Quinton Jackson  def. Matt Hamill  via unanimous decision

Rugby union
IRB Junior World Trophy in Georgia:
Group A:
 37–6 
 42–36 
Standings (after 2 matches): Samoa 10 points, Russia 5, Uruguay 4, United States 2.
Group B:
 30–15 
 50–19 
Standings (after 2 matches): Georgia, Japan 10 points, Canada, Zimbabwe 0.
 Aviva Premiership Final in London: Leicester Tigers 18–22 Saracens
Saracens win the title for the first time.
 Celtic League Grand Final in Limerick: Munster 19–9 Leinster
Munster win the title for a record-equalling third time.
 Top 14 semi-final in Marseille: Racing Métro 25–26 Montpellier

Tennis
French Open in Paris, France, day 7:
Men's Singles, third round:
Rafael Nadal  [1] def. Antonio Veić  6–1, 6–3, 6–0
Novak Djokovic  [2] def. Juan Martín del Potro  [25] 6–3, 3–6, 6–3, 6–2
Andy Murray  [4] def. Michael Berrer  6–2, 6–3, 6–2
Robin Söderling  [5] def. Leonardo Mayer  6–1, 6–4, 6–3
Gilles Simon  [18] def. Mardy Fish  [10] 6–3, 6–4, 6–2
Women's Singles, third round:
Victoria Azarenka  [4] def. Roberta Vinci  [30] 6–3, 6–2
Li Na  [6] def. Sorana Cîrstea  6–2, 6–2
Maria Sharapova  [7] def. Chan Yung-jan  6–2, 6–3
Petra Kvitová  [9] def. Vania King  6–4, 6–2

Volleyball
FIVB World League, Week 1 (teams in bold advance to the final round):
Pool A:
 0–3 
 0–3 
Standings (after 2 matches): Brazil 6 points, Poland, United States 3, Puerto Rico 0.
Pool B:
 3–1 
 2–3 
Standings: Russia 6 points (2 matches), Germany 2 (1), Bulgaria 1 (1), Japan 0 (2).
Pool C:
 0–3 
 3–2 
Pool D:  3–0 
Men's European Volleyball League, Leg 1:
Pool A:
 3–2 
 1–3 
Pool B:
 3–0 
 1–3 
Standings (after 2 matches): Greece 6 points, Spain, Netherlands 3, Austria 0.
Pool C:
 1–3 
 1–3 
Standings: Belarus 3 points (1 match), Romania, Slovakia 3 (2), Turkey 0 (1).
Women's European Volleyball League, Leg 1:
Pool A:
 3–0 
 0–3 
Standings (after 2 matches): Serbia 6 points, France, Spain 3, Greece 0.
Pool B:
 1–3 
 1–3 
Standings (after 2 matches): Israel, Czech Republic, Bulgaria, Hungary 3 points.
Pool C:
 3–1 
 3–1 
Standings: Romania 6 points (2 matches), Turkey 3 (1), Belarus 0 (1), Croatia 0 (2).

May 27, 2011 (Friday)

Badminton
Sudirman Cup in Qingdao, China:
Quarterfinals:
 3–1 
 2–3

Cricket
Sri Lanka in England:
1st Test in Cardiff; day 2:  400 (118.4 overs; Prasanna Jayawardene 112);  47/1 (20 overs). England trail by 353 runs with 9 wickets remaining in the 1st innings.
Indian Premier League Playoff:
Qualifier 2 in Chennai: Royal Challengers Bangalore 185/4 (20 overs); Mumbai Indians 142/8 (20 overs). Royal Challengers Bangalore win by 43 runs.

Cycling
Grand Tours:
Giro d'Italia, Stage 19:  Paolo Tiralongo  5h 26' 27"  Alberto Contador   s.t.  Vincenzo Nibali  + 3"
General classification (after stage 19): (1) Contador  77h 11' 24" (2) Michele Scarponi  + 5' 18" (3) Nibali + 5' 52"

Equestrianism
FEI Nations Cup Show Jumping:
Nations Cup of Italy in Rome (CSIO 5*):   (Eric van der Vleuten, Harry Smolders, Gerco Schröder, Jeroen Dubbeldam)   (Philippe Le Jeune, Dirk Demeersman, Judy-Ann Melchior, Jos Lansink)   (Shane Sweetnam, Shane Carey, Cameron Hanley, Billy Twomey)
Standings (standings after 2 of 8 events): (1) Ireland 16 points (2) Belgium 14 (3) Netherlands 13.5
FEI Nations Cup Show Jumping – Promotional League, Europe:
Nations Cup of Portugal in Lisbon (CSIO 3*):   (Erika Lickhammer, Lisen Bratt Fredriksson, Alexander Zetterman, Helena Persson)   (Martin Fuchs, Marc Oertly, Jessy Putallaz, Steve Guerdat)   (Aldrick Cheronnet, Jerome Hurel, Eugenie Angot, Florian Angot) &  (Laura Renwick, Bruce Menzies, Matthew Sampson, William Funnell)
Standings (after 4 of 7 competitions): (1) Sweden 29.5 points (2) Switzerland 25.5 (3)  25

Football (soccer)
Nations Cup in Dublin, Republic of Ireland:  2–0 
Standings: ,  6 points (2 matches), Wales 3 (3), Northern Ireland 0 (3).

Golf
Senior majors:
Senior PGA Championship presented by KitchenAid in Louisville, Kentucky:
Leaderboard after first round: (1) Kiyoshi Murota  66 (−6) (T2) Trevor Dodds  & Nick Price  67 (−5)
Leaderboard after second day: (1) Murota 133 (−11) (T2) Hale Irwin  & Price 137 (−7)
31 players will complete their second round on May 28.

Ice hockey
Stanley Cup Playoffs:
Eastern Conference Finals: (series best-of-7; seeds in parentheses)
Game 7 in Boston: (3) Boston Bruins 1, (5) Tampa Bay Lightning 0. Bruins win series 4–3.
The Bruins advance to the Stanley Cup Finals for the 18th time and first time since 1990.
Memorial Cup in Mississauga, Ontario:
Semi-final: Mississauga St. Michael's Majors 3, Kootenay Ice 1

Rugby union
 Top 14 semi-final in Marseille: Toulouse 29–6 Clermont

Tennis
French Open in Paris, France, day 6:
Men's Singles, third round:
Novak Djokovic  [2] vs. Juan Martín del Potro  [25] 6–3, 3–6 (match suspended)
Roger Federer  [3] def. Janko Tipsarević  [29] 6–1, 6–4, 6–3
David Ferrer  [7] def. Sergiy Stakhovsky  [31] 6–1, 6–1, 6–3
Gaël Monfils  [9] def. Steve Darcis  6–3, 6–4, 7–5
Women's Singles, third round:
Daniela Hantuchová  [28] def. Caroline Wozniacki  [1] 6–1, 6–3
Vera Zvonareva  [3] def. Anastasia Rodionova  6–2, 6–3
Francesca Schiavone  [5] def. Peng Shuai  [29] 6–3, 1–2 retired
Gisela Dulko  def. Samantha Stosur  [8] 6–4, 1–6, 6–3
Jelena Janković  [10] def. Bethanie Mattek-Sands  6–2, 6–2

Volleyball
FIVB World League, Week 1 (teams in bold advance to the final round):
Pool A:
 3–0 
 0–3 
Pool B:  3–0 
Pool D:  0–3 
Men's European League, Leg 1:
Pool B:  0–3 
Pool C:  3–0 
Women's European League, Leg 1:
Pool A:
 3–0 
 3–1 
Pool B:
 3–1 
 3–1 
Pool C:  3–0

May 26, 2011 (Thursday)

Athletics
IAAF Diamond League:
Golden Gala in Rome, Italy:
Men:
100m: Usain Bolt  9.91
200m: Andrew Howe  20.31
4 × 100 m relay:  38.65
400m: Chris Brown  45.16
400m hurdles: L. J. van Zyl  47.91
800m: Khadevis Robinson  1:45.09
5000m: Imane Merga  12:54.21
Triple jump: Phillips Idowu  17.59m
Pole vault: Renaud Lavillenie  5.82m
Shot put: Dylan Armstrong  21.60m
Women:
100m hurdles: Dawn Harper  12.70
200m: Bianca Knight  22.64
400m: Allyson Felix  49.81
1500m: Maryam Yusuf Jamal  4:01.60
3000m steeplechase: Milcah Chemos Cheywa  9:12.89
Long jump: Brittney Reese  6.94m
High jump: Blanka Vlašić  1.95m
Discus throw: Sandra Perković  65.56m
Javelin throw: Mariya Abakumova  65.40m

Badminton
Sudirman Cup in Qingdao, China:
Quarterfinals:
 3–2 
 3–1

Basketball
NBA Playoffs:
Eastern Conference Finals: (series best-of-7; seeds in parentheses)
Game 5 in Chicago: (2) Miami Heat 83, (1) Chicago Bulls 80. Heat win series 4–1.
 Österreichische Bundesliga Finals, Game 5: Allianz Swans Gmunden 75–77 Oberwart Gunners. Oberwart Gunners win best-of-5 series 3–2.
Oberwart Gunners win the title for the first time.
 Israeli Final Four in Tel Aviv:
Third-place playoff: Hapoel Jerusalem 94–74 Maccabi Rishon LeZion
Final: Maccabi Tel Aviv 91–64 Hapoel Gilboa Galil
Maccabi Tel Aviv win the title for the 49th time.

Cricket
Sri Lanka in England:
1st Test in Cardiff; day 1:  133/2 (48 overs); .

Cycling
Grand Tours:
Giro d'Italia, Stage 18:  Eros Capecchi  3h 20' 38"  Marco Pinotti  s.t.  Kevin Seeldraeyers  s.t.
General classification (after stage 18): (1) Alberto Contador   71h 45' 09" (2) Michele Scarponi  + 4' 58" (3) Vincenzo Nibali  + 5' 45"

Football (soccer)
UEFA Women's Champions League Final in London: Lyon  2–0  Turbine Potsdam
Lyon becomes the first French team to win the title.
Copa Libertadores Semifinals, first leg: Peñarol  1–0  Vélez Sársfield
 Canadian Championship Final, second leg (first leg score in parentheses):
Toronto FC – (1–1) Vancouver Whitecaps — postponed to July 2 due to a waterlogged pitch.
 Georgian Cup Final in Tbilisi: Gagra 1–0 (a.e.t.) Torpedo Kutaisi
Gagra win the Cup for the first time.
 Moldovan Cup Final in Chişinău: Iskra-Stal 2–1 Olimpia
Iskra-Stal win the Cup for the first time.

Golf
Senior majors:
Senior PGA Championship presented by KitchenAid in Louisville, Kentucky:
Leaderboard after first day: (1) Kiyoshi Murota  66 (−6) (2) Trevor Dodds  67 (−5) (3) Mark O'Meara  68 (−4)
78 players will complete their first round on May 27.

Ice hockey
Memorial Cup in Mississauga, Ontario:
Tiebreaker: Kootenay Ice 7, Owen Sound Attack 3

Tennis
French Open in Paris, France, day 5:
Men's Singles, second round:
Rafael Nadal  [1] def. Pablo Andújar  7–5, 6–3, 7–6(4)
Andy Murray  [4] def. Simone Bolelli  7–6(3), 6–4, 7–5
Robin Söderling  [5] def. Albert Ramos  6–3, 6–4, 6–4
Lukáš Rosol  def. Jürgen Melzer  [8] 6–7(4), 6–4, 4–6, 7–6(3), 6–4
Mardy Fish  [10] def. Robin Haase  7–6(1), 6–2, 6–1
Women's Singles, second round:
Arantxa Rus  def. Kim Clijsters  [2] 3–6, 7–5, 6–1
Victoria Azarenka  [4] def. Pauline Parmentier  6–0, 6–1
Li Na  [6] def. Silvia Soler Espinosa  6–4, 7–5
Maria Sharapova  [7] def. Caroline Garcia  3–6, 6–4, 6–0
Petra Kvitová  [9] def. Zheng Jie  6–4, 6–1

Volleyball
Men's European League, Leg 1:
Pool B:  1–3

May 25, 2011 (Wednesday)

Badminton
Sudirman Cup in Qingdao, China: (teams in bold advance to the quarterfinals)
Group B:  3–2 
Final standings: Indonesia 2–0, Malaysia 1–1,  0–2.
Group D:  2–3 
Final standings: Korea 2–0, Denmark 1–1,  0–2.

Basketball
NBA Playoffs:
Western Conference Finals: (series best-of-7; seeds in parentheses)
Game 5 in Dallas: (3) Dallas Mavericks 100, (4) Oklahoma City Thunder 96. Mavericks win series 4–1.
The Mavericks advance to the NBA Finals for the second time.

Cricket
Indian Premier League Playoff:
Eliminator in Mumbai: Kolkata Knight Riders 147/7 (20 overs); Mumbai Indians 148/6 (19.2 overs). Mumbai Indians win by 4 wickets.

Cycling
Grand Tours:
Giro d'Italia, Stage 17:  Diego Ulissi  5h 31' 51"  Pablo Lastras  s.t.  Giovanni Visconti  s.t.
General classification (after stage 17): (1) Alberto Contador   68h 18' 27" (2) Michele Scarponi  + 4' 58" (3) Vincenzo Nibali  + 5' 45"

Football (soccer)
Nations Cup in Dublin, Republic of Ireland:  1–3 
Standings (after 2 matches): , Scotland 6 points, Wales,  0.
Friendly international: (top 10 in FIFA World Rankings)
(5)  4–2 
Copa Libertadores Semifinals, first leg: Santos  1–0  Cerro Porteño
AFC Champions League Round of 16:
Al-Sadd  1–0  Al-Shabab
Zob Ahan  4–1  Al-Nassr
FC Seoul  3–0  Kashima Antlers
Suwon Samsung Bluewings  2–0  Nagoya Grampus
AFC Cup Round of 16:
Al-Qadsia  2–2 (2–3 pen.)  Al-Kuwait
Al-Wehdat  2–1  Shurtan Guzar
Sông Lam Nghệ An  1–3  Persipura Jayapura
Chonburi  3–0  Sriwijaya
 Austrian Bundesliga, final matchday (team in bold qualifies for the UEFA Champions League, teams in italics qualify for the UEFA Europa League):
Austria Wien 2–4 Red Bull Salzburg
Sturm Graz 2–1 FC Wacker Innsbruck
Final standings: Sturm Graz 66 points, Red Bull Salzburg 63, Austria Wien 61.
Sturm Graz win the title for the third time.
 Serbian SuperLiga, matchday 29 (team in bold qualifies for the UEFA Champions League, teams in italics qualify for the UEFA Europa League):
Metalac G.M. 1–1 Partizan
Smederevo 0–0 Vojvodina
Red Star Belgrade 2–2 Spartak Zlatibor Voda
Standings: Partizan 73 points, Red Star, Vojvodina 67.
Partizan win the title for the fourth successive time.
 Swiss Super League, final matchday (teams in bold qualify for the UEFA Champions League, teams in italics qualify for the UEFA Europa League):
Basel 3–0 Luzern
Zürich 1–0 Thun
Final standings: Basel 73 points, Zürich 72, Young Boys 57, Sion 54.
Basel win the title for the second successive time, and 14th time overall.
 Bosnia and Herzegovina Cup Final, second leg (first leg score in parentheses):
Čelik 0–3 (0–1) Željezničar. Željezničar win 4–0 on aggregate.
Željezničar win the Cup for a record fourth time.
 Bulgarian Cup Final in Sofia: CSKA Sofia 1–0 Slavia Sofia
CSKA Sofia win the Cup for the 20th time.
 Croatian Cup Final, second leg (first leg score in parentheses):
Varaždin 1–3 (1–5) Dinamo Zagreb. Dinamo Zagreb win 8–2 on aggregate.
Dinamo Zagreb win the Cup for the eleventh time.
 Czech Cup Final in Jihlava: Mladá Boleslav 1–1 (4–3 pen.) Sigma Olomouc
Mladá Boleslav win the Cup for the first time.
 Israel State Cup Final in Ramat Gan: Hapoel Tel Aviv 1–0 Maccabi Haifa
Hapoel Tel Aviv win the Cup for the 14th time.
 Montenegrin Cup Final in Podgorica: Mogren 2–2 (4–5 pen.) Rudar Pljevlja
Rudar win the Cup for the third time.
 Cupa României Final in Braşov: Steaua București 2–1 Dinamo București
Steaua București win the Cup for the 21st time.
 Slovenian Cup Final in Ljubljana: Domžale 4–3 Maribor
Domžale win the Cup for the first time.
 Ukrainian Cup Final in Sumy: Shakhtar Donetsk 2–0 FC Dynamo Kyiv
Shakhtar Donetsk win the Cup for the seventh time.
 Canadian Championship Final, second leg (first leg score in parentheses):
Toronto FC 0–1 (1–1) Vancouver Whitecaps — match abandoned after 60 minutes due to a waterlogged pitch. The match is due to be replayed in its entirety on May 26.

Ice hockey
Stanley Cup Playoffs:
Eastern Conference Finals: (series best-of-7; seeds in parentheses)
Game 6 in Tampa: (5) Tampa Bay Lightning 5, (3) Boston Bruins 4. Series tied 3–3.
Memorial Cup in Mississauga, Ontario (team in bold advances to the final, teams in italics advance to the tiebreaker):
Round robin: Mississauga St. Michael's Majors 3, Owen Sound Attack 1
Final standings: Saint John Sea Dogs, Mississauga St. Michael's Majors 4 points, Owen Sound Attack, Kootenay Ice 2.

Rugby league
State of Origin Series:
Game I in Brisbane: Queensland  16–12  New South Wales. Queensland lead 3-match series 1–0.

Tennis
French Open in Paris, France, day 4:
Men's Singles, second round:
Novak Djokovic  [2] def. Victor Hănescu  6–4, 6–1, 2–3 retired
Roger Federer  [3] def. Maxime Teixeira  6–3, 6–0, 6–2
David Ferrer  [7] def. Julien Benneteau  6–3, 6–4, 6–2
Gaël Monfils  [9] def. Guillaume Rufin  6–3, 1–6, 6–1, 6–3
Women's Singles, second round:
Caroline Wozniacki  [1] def. Aleksandra Wozniak  6–3, 7–6(6)
Vera Zvonareva  [3] def. Sabine Lisicki  4–6, 7–5, 7–5
Francesca Schiavone  [5] def. Vesna Dolonts  6–1, 6–2
Samantha Stosur  [8] def. Simona Halep  6–0, 6–2

May 24, 2011 (Tuesday)

Badminton
Sudirman Cup in Qingdao, China: (teams in bold advance to the quarterfinals)
Group A:  5–0 
Final standings: China 2–0, Japan 1–1,  0–2.
Group C:  3–2 
Final standings: Chinese Taipei 2–0,  1–1, Thailand 0–2.

Basketball
NBA Playoffs:
Eastern Conference Finals: (series best-of-7; seeds in parentheses)
Game 4 in Miami: (2) Miami Heat 101, (1) Chicago Bulls 93 (OT). Heat lead series 3–1.
 Novo Basquete Brasil Finals: (series best-of-5)
Game 4: UniCEUB/BRB/Brasília 77–68 Franca. Brasília win series 3–1.
Brasília win the championship for the second straight time.

Cricket
Pakistan in the West Indies:
2nd Test in Basseterre, Saint Kitts; day 5:  272 & 377/6d;  223 & 230 (80.3 overs). Pakistan win by 196 runs; 2-match series drawn 1–1.
Indian Premier League Playoff:
Qualifier 1 in Mumbai: Royal Challengers Bangalore 175/4 (20 overs); Chennai Super Kings 177/4 (19.4 overs). Chennai Super Kings win by 6 wickets.

Cycling
Grand Tours:
Giro d'Italia, Stage 16:  Alberto Contador   28' 55"  Vincenzo Nibali  + 34"  Michele Scarponi  + 38"
General classification (after stage 16): (1) Contador  62h 43' 37" (2) Scarponi + 4' 58" (3) Nibali + 5' 45"

Football (soccer)
Nations Cup in Dublin, Republic of Ireland:  5–0 
Standings: Republic of Ireland 6 points (2 matches),  3 (1),  0 (1), Northern Ireland 0 (2).
AFC Champions League Round of 16:
Sepahan  3–1  Bunyodkor
Al-Ittihad  3–1  Al-Hilal
Gamba Osaka  0–1  Cerezo Osaka
Jeonbuk Hyundai Motors  3–0  Tianjin Teda
AFC Cup Round of 16:
Nasaf Qarshi  2–1  Al-Faisaly
Duhok  1–0  Dempo
Arbil  1–0 (a.e.t.)  Tampines Rovers
Muangthong United  4–0  Al Ahed
 Azerbaijan Cup Final in Baku: Inter Baku 1–1 (2–4 pen.) Khazar Lankaran
Khazar win the Cup for the third time.
 Macedonian Cup Final in Prilep: Teteks 0–2 Metalurg
Metalurg win the Cup for the first time.

Ice hockey
Stanley Cup Playoffs:
Western Conference Finals: (series best-of-7; seeds in parentheses)
Game 5 in Vancouver: (1) Vancouver Canucks 3, (2) San Jose Sharks 2 (2OT). Canucks win series 4–1.
The Canucks advance to the Stanley Cup Finals for the third time.
Memorial Cup in Mississauga, Ontario (team in bold advances to the final, team in italics advances to the tiebreaker):
Round robin: Kootenay Ice 5, Saint John Sea Dogs 4 (OT)
Standings: Saint John Sea Dogs 4 points (3 games), Owen Sound Attack, Mississauga St. Michael's Majors 2 (2), Kootenay Ice 2 (3).

Rugby union
IRB Junior World Trophy in Georgia:
Group A:
 48–11 
 5–33 
Group B:
 37–24 
 38–9

Tennis
French Open in Paris, France, day 3:
Men's Singles, first round:
Rafael Nadal  [1] def. John Isner  6–4, 6–7(2), 6–7(2), 6–2, 6–4
Andy Murray  [4] def. Éric Prodon  6–4, 6–1, 6–3
Robin Söderling  [5] def. Ryan Harrison  6–1, 6–7(5), 6–3, 7–5
Jürgen Melzer  [8] def. Andreas Beck  6–3, 6–4, 6–2
Women's Singles, first round:
Kim Clijsters  [2] def. Anastasiya Yakimova  6–2, 6–3
Victoria Azarenka  [4] def. Andrea Hlaváčková  6–3, 6–3
Li Na  [6] def. Barbora Záhlavová-Strýcová  6–3, 6–7(6), 6–3
Maria Sharapova  [7] def. Mirjana Lučić  6–3, 6–0

May 23, 2011 (Monday)

Badminton
Sudirman Cup in Qingdao, China: (teams in bold advance to the quarterfinals)
Group A:  4–1 
Standings: , Japan 1–0, Germany 0–2.
Group B:  4–1 
Standings: , Malaysia 1–0, Russia 0–2.
Group C:  2–3 
Standings:  1–0, India 1–1, Thailand 0–1.
Group D:  4–1 
Standings: , Korea 1–0, England 0–2.

Basketball
NBA Playoffs:
Western Conference Finals: (series best-of-7; seeds in parentheses)
Game 4 in Oklahoma City: (3) Dallas Mavericks 112, (4) Oklahoma City Thunder 105 (OT). Mavericks lead series 3–1.
 Polish League Finals, Game 7: Asseco Prokom Gdynia 76–71 Turów Zgorzelec. Asseco Prokom Gdynia win series 4–3.
Asseco Prokom win the championship for the eighth successive time.

Cricket
Pakistan in the West Indies:
2nd Test in Basseterre, Saint Kitts; day 4:  272 & 377/6d (112.2 overs; Taufeeq Umar 135, Misbah-ul-Haq 102*);  223 & 130/5 (53 overs). West Indies require another 297 runs with 5 wickets remaining.

Ice hockey
Stanley Cup Playoffs:
Eastern Conference Finals: (series best-of-7; seeds in parentheses)
Game 5 in Boston: (3) Boston Bruins 3, (5) Tampa Bay Lightning 1. Bruins lead series 3–2.
Memorial Cup in Mississauga, Ontario (team in bold advances to the final):
Round robin: Saint John Sea Dogs 3, Owen Sound Attack 2 (OT)
Standings (after 2 games): Saint John Sea Dogs 4 points, Owen Sound Attack, Mississauga St. Michael's Majors 2, Kootenay Ice 0.

Tennis
French Open in Paris, France, day 2:
Men's Singles, first round:
Novak Djokovic  [2] def. Thiemo de Bakker  6–2, 6–1, 6–3
Roger Federer  [3] def. Feliciano López  6–3, 6–3, 7–6(3)
Stéphane Robert  def. Tomáš Berdych  [6] 3–6, 3–6, 6–2, 6–2, 9–7
Gaël Monfils  [9] def. Björn Phau  4–6, 6–3, 7–5, 6–0
Mardy Fish  [10] def. Ricardo Mello  6–2, 6–7(11), 6–2, 6–4
Women's Singles, first round:
Caroline Wozniacki  [1] def. Kimiko Date-Krumm  6–0, 6–2
Vera Zvonareva  [3] def. Lourdes Domínguez Lino  6–3, 6–3
Francesca Schiavone  [5] def. Melanie Oudin  6–2, 6–0
Petra Kvitová  [9] def. Gréta Arn  6–2, 6–1

May 22, 2011 (Sunday)

Auto racing
Formula One:
 in Montmeló, Spain: (1) Sebastian Vettel  (Red Bull-Renault) (2) Lewis Hamilton  (McLaren-Mercedes) (3) Jenson Button  (McLaren-Mercedes)
Drivers' championship standings (after 5 of 19 races): (1) Vettel 118 points (2) Hamilton 77 (3) Mark Webber  (Red Bull-Renault) 67
Nationwide Series:
Iowa John Deere Dealers 250 in Newton, Iowa: (1)  Ricky Stenhouse Jr. (Ford; Roush Fenway Racing) (2)  Carl Edwards (Ford; Roush Fenway Racing) (3)  Brad Keselowski (Dodge; Penske Racing)
Drivers' championship standings (after 12 of 34 races): (1)  Elliott Sadler (Chevrolet; Kevin Harvick Incorporated) 418 points (2)  Reed Sorenson (Chevrolet; Turner Motorsports) 411 (3) Stenhouse Jr. 410
V8 Supercars:
Winton 300 in Benalla, Victoria:
Race 11: (1) Jason Bright  (Brad Jones Racing, Holden VE Commodore) (2) Jamie Whincup  (Triple Eight Race Engineering, Holden VE Commodore) (3) Garth Tander  (Holden Racing Team, Holden VE Commodore)
Drivers' championship standings (after 11 of 27 races): (1) Whincup 1234 points (2) Craig Lowndes  (Triple Eight Race Engineering, Holden VE Commodore) 972 (3) Tander 935

Badminton
Sudirman Cup in Qingdao, China:
Group A:  4–1 
Group B:  4–1 
Group C:  3–2 
Group D:  5–0

Basketball
NBA Playoffs:
Eastern Conference Finals: (series best-of-7; seeds in parentheses)
Game 3 in Miami: (2) Miami Heat 96, (1) Chicago Bulls 85. Heat lead series 2–1.

Cricket
Pakistan in the West Indies:
2nd Test in Basseterre, Saint Kitts; day 3:  272 & 202/3 (75 overs);  223 (83.5 overs). Pakistan lead by 251 runs with 7 wickets remaining.

Cycling
Grand Tours:
Giro d'Italia, Stage 15:  Mikel Nieve  7h 27' 14"  Stefano Garzelli  + 1' 41"  Alberto Contador   + 1' 51"
General classification (after stage 15): (1) Contador  62h 14' 42" (2) Michele Scarponi  + 4' 20" (3) Vincenzo Nibali  + 5' 11"
UCI America Tour:
Tour of California, Stage 8:  Matthew Goss  2h 56' 39"  Peter Sagan   s.t.  Greg Henderson  s.t.
Final general classification: (1) Chris Horner   23h 46' 41" (2) Levi Leipheimer  + 38" (3) Tom Danielson  + 2' 45"

Football (soccer)
 Primera División de México Clausura Liguilla Final, second leg (first leg score in parentheses):
UNAM 2–1 (1–1) Monarcas Morelia. UNAM win 3–2 on aggregate.
UNAM win the title for the seventh time.
 Premier League, matchday 29 (team in bold qualifies for the UEFA Champions League, teams in italics qualify for the UEFA Europa League):
Željezničar 0–1 Borac Banja Luka
Standings: Borac Banja Luka 63 points, Željezničar 55, Sarajevo 54.
Borac win the title for the first time.
 Umaglesi Liga, final matchday (team in bold qualifies for the UEFA Champions League, teams in italics qualify for the UEFA Europa League):
Zestafoni 4–0 WIT Georgia
Dinamo Tbilisi 1–2 Torpedo 2008 Kutaisi
Standings: Zestafoni 78 points, Dinamo Tbilisi 72, Olimpi Rustavi 66.
Zestafoni win the title for the first time.
 Süper Lig, final matchday (teams in bold qualify for the UEFA Champions League, team in italics qualifies for the UEFA Europa League):
Sivasspor 3–4 Fenerbahçe
Kardemir Karabükspor 0–4 Trabzonspor
Standings: Fenerbahçe 82 points (+50 goal difference), Trabzonspor 82 (+46), Bursaspor 61.
Fenerbahçe win the title for a record 18th time.
 Taça de Portugal Final in Oeiras: Porto 6–2 Vitória de Guimarães
Porto win the Cup for the third successive time, and 16th time overall. Porto also complete a treble, with wins in the Primeira Liga and Europa League.
 Russian Cup Final in Yaroslavl: CSKA Moscow 2–1 Alania Vladikavkaz
CSKA Moscow win the Cup for a record sixth time.
 Danish Cup Final in Copenhagen: FC Nordsjælland 3–2 FC Midtjylland
Nordsjælland win the Cup for the second successive time.
 Albanian Cup Final in Tirana: KF Tirana 1–1 (4–3 pen.) Dinamo Tirana
KF Tirana win the Cup for the 14th time.
 Maltese Cup Final in Ta' Qali: Valletta 0–1 Floriana
Floriana win the Cup for the 19th time.

Golf
PGA Tour:
Crowne Plaza Invitational at Colonial in Fort Worth, Texas:
Winner: David Toms  265 (−15)
Toms wins his 13th PGA Tour title, and first since 2006.
European Tour:
Volvo World Match Play Championship in Casares, Málaga, Spain:
Final: Ian Poulter  def. Luke Donald  2 & 1
Poulter wins his 11th European Tour title, and denies Donald the number 1 spot in the official world rankings.
Madeira Islands Open in Porto Santo, Madeira, Portugal:
Winner: Michael Hoey  278 (−10)
Hoey wins his second European Tour title.
LPGA Tour:
Sybase Match Play Championship in Gladstone, New Jersey:
Final: Suzann Pettersen  def. Cristie Kerr  1 up
Pettersen wins her seventh LPGA Tour title.

Ice hockey
Stanley Cup Playoffs:
Western Conference Finals: (series best-of-7; seeds in parentheses)
Game 4 in San Jose: (1) Vancouver Canucks 4, (2) San Jose Sharks 2. Canucks lead series 3–1.
Memorial Cup in Mississauga, Ontario:
Round robin: Mississauga St. Michael's Majors 2, Kootenay Ice 1
Standings: Owen Sound Attack, Saint John Sea Dogs 2 points (1 game), Mississauga St. Michael's Majors 2 (2), Kootenay Ice 0 (2).

Rugby union
IRB Sevens World Series:
London Sevens at Twickenham:
Shield:  7–22 
Bowl:  21–19 
Plate:  22–12 
Cup:  14–24 
Standings (after 7 of 8 competitions): (1)  150 points (2) England 121 (3) South Africa 116
New Zealand clinch their ninth series title in 12 seasons of the Sevens World Series.
 Pro D2 promotion final in Agen: Albi 14–21 Bordeaux
Bordeaux earns promotion to the Top 14 for the first time since the club's creation in a 2006 merger, joining season champion Lyon.

Tennis
French Open in Paris, France, day 1:
Men's Singles, first round:
David Ferrer  [7] def. Jarkko Nieminen  6–3, 6–3, 6–1
Women's Singles, first round:
Samantha Stosur  [8] def. Iveta Benešová  6–2, 6–3
Jelena Janković  [10] def. Alona Bondarenko  6–3, 6–1

May 21, 2011 (Saturday)

Athletics
 Betty Heidler  breaks the world record for the women's hammer throw, registering a distance of 79.42 metres in Halle, Germany. She improves the previous record of Anita Włodarczyk  by 1.12 metres.

Auto racing
Sprint Cup Series:
NASCAR Sprint All-Star Race in Concord, North Carolina: (1)  Carl Edwards (Ford; Roush Fenway Racing) (2)  Kyle Busch (Toyota; Joe Gibbs Racing) (3)  David Reutimann (Toyota; Michael Waltrip Racing)
V8 Supercars:
Winton 300 in Benalla, Victoria:
Race 10: (1) Jamie Whincup  (Triple Eight Race Engineering, Holden VE Commodore) (2) Lee Holdsworth  (Garry Rogers Motorsport, Holden VE Commodore) (3) Steven Johnson  (Dick Johnson Racing, Ford FG Falcon)
Drivers' championship standings (after 10 of 27 races): (1) Whincup 1096 points (2) Craig Lowndes  (Triple Eight Race Engineering, Holden VE Commodore) 876 (3) Rick Kelly  (Kelly Racing, Holden VE Commodore) 833
IndyCar Series:
95th Indianapolis 500 – Qualification in Speedway, Indiana:
Front row: (1) Alex Tagliani  (Sam Schmidt Motorsports) 227.472 mph (2) Scott Dixon  (Chip Ganassi Racing) 227.340 mph (3) Oriol Servià  (Newman/Haas Racing) 227.168 mph
Tagliani becomes the first Canadian driver to take pole position for the race.

Basketball
NBA Playoffs:
Western Conference Finals: (series best-of-7; seeds in parentheses)
Game 3 in Oklahoma City: (3) Dallas Mavericks 93, (4) Oklahoma City Thunder 87. Mavericks lead series 2–1.

Cricket
Pakistan in the West Indies:
2nd Test in Basseterre, Saint Kitts; day 2:  272 (109.5 overs);  184/8 (63 overs). West Indies trail by 88 runs with 2 wickets remaining in the 1st innings.

Cycling
Grand Tours:
Giro d'Italia, Stage 14:  Igor Antón  5h 04' 26"  Alberto Contador   + 33"  Vincenzo Nibali  + 40"
General classification (after stage 14): (1) Contador  54h 45' 45" (2) Nibali + 3' 20" (3) Antón + 3' 21"
UCI America Tour:
Tour of California, Stage 7:  Levi Leipheimer  3h 33' 01"  Chris Horner   s.t.  Laurens ten Dam  + 43"
General classification (after stage 7): (1) Horner  20h 50' 02" (2) Leipheimer + 38" (3) Tom Danielson  + 2' 45"

Football (soccer)
Friendly women's international (top 10 in FIFA Women's World Rankings):
(2)  2–0 (8) 
 Ligue 1, matchday 37 (teams in bold qualify for the UEFA Champions League):
Marseille 2–2 Valenciennes
Paris Saint-Germain 2–2 Lille
Standings: Lille 73 points, Marseille 67, Lyon 61.
Lille win the title for the first time since 1953–54, and third time overall.
 A PFG, matchday 29 (team in bold qualifies for the UEFA Champions League, teams in italics qualify for the UEFA Europa League):
Akademik Sofia 0–3 Levski Sofia
Lokomotiv Sofia 1–3 Litex Lovech
Standings: Litex Lovech 74 points, Levski Sofia 69, CSKA Sofia 58.
Litex win their second successive title, and fourth overall.
 Gambrinus liga, matchday 29 (team in bold qualifies for the UEFA Champions League, teams in italics qualify for the UEFA Europa League):
Viktoria Plzeň 3–1 Baník Ostrava
Ústí nad Labem 1–3 Sparta Prague
Standings: Viktoria Plzeň 69 points, Sparta Prague 65, Jablonec 55.
Viktoria Plzeň win the title for the first time.
 PrvaLiga, matchday 35 (team in bold qualifies for the UEFA Champions League, teams in italics qualify for the UEFA Europa League):
Domžale 3–0 Olimpija
Primorje 1–2 Maribor
Standings: Maribor 72 points, Domžale 67, Koper 60.
Maribor win the title for the ninth time.
 Superliga, matchday 32 (team in bold qualifies for the UEFA Champions League, teams in italics qualify for the UEFA Europa League):
Slovan Bratislava 3–1 Dubnica
Ružomberok 3–2 Senica
Standings: Slovan Bratislava 65 points, Senica 58, Žilina 54.
Slovan Bratislava win the title for a record sixth time.
 DFB-Pokal Final in Berlin: Duisburg 0–5 Schalke 04
Schalke win the Cup for the fifth time.
 Scottish Cup Final in Glasgow: Motherwell 0–3 Celtic
Celtic win the Cup for the 35th time.
 Belgian Cup Final in Brussels: Westerlo 0–2 Standard Liège
Standard Liège win the Cup for the first time since 1993, and sixth time overall.

Horse racing
U.S. Thoroughbred Triple Crown:
Preakness Stakes in Baltimore:  Shackleford (trainer: Dale L. Romans; jockey: Jesús Castañón)  Animal Kingdom (trainer: H. Graham Motion; jockey: John R. Velazquez)  Astrology (trainer: Steve Asmussen; jockey: Mike E. Smith)
Shackleford's victory in the second race of the Triple Crown over Kentucky Derby winner Animal Kingdom extends U.S. Thoroughbred racing's longest losing streak to 33 years since Steve Cauthen's Affirmed last won the Triple Crown championship.

Ice hockey
Stanley Cup Playoffs:
Eastern Conference Finals: (series best-of-7; seeds in parentheses)
Game 4 in Tampa: (5) Tampa Bay Lightning 5, (3) Boston Bruins 3. Series tied 2–2.
Memorial Cup in Mississauga, Ontario:
Round robin: Owen Sound Attack 5, Kootenay Ice 0.

Rugby union
Heineken Cup Final in Cardiff: Northampton Saints  22–33  Leinster
Leinster win the Cup for the second time in three seasons.

Tennis
ATP World Tour:
Power Horse World Team Cup in Düsseldorf, Germany:
Final:  2–1 
Florian Mayer  def. Juan Mónaco  7–6(4), 6–0
Juan Ignacio Chela  def. Philipp Kohlschreiber  6–4, 7–6(4)
Kohlschreiber/Philipp Petzschner  def. Chela/Máximo González  6–3, 7–6(5)
Germany win the Cup for a record fifth time.
Open de Nice Côte d'Azur in Nice, France:
Final: Nicolás Almagro  def. Victor Hănescu  6–7(5), 6–3, 6–3
Almagro wins his third title of the year and tenth of his career.
WTA Tour:
Brussels Open in Brussels, Belgium:
Final: Caroline Wozniacki  def. Peng Shuai  2–6, 6–3, 6–3
Wozniacki wins her fourth title of the year and 16th of her career.
Internationaux de Strasbourg in Strasbourg, France:
Final: Andrea Petkovic  def. Marion Bartoli  6–4, 1–0 retired
Petkovic wins her second career title.

May 20, 2011 (Friday)

Cricket
Pakistan in the West Indies:
2nd Test in Basseterre, Saint Kitts; day 1:  180/6 (73.2 overs); .

Cycling
Grand Tours:
Giro d'Italia, Stage 13:  José Rujano  4h 45' 54"  Alberto Contador   s.t.  John Gadret  + 1' 27"
General classification (after stage 13): (1) Contador  49h 40' 58" (2) Vincenzo Nibali  + 3' 09" (3) Michele Scarponi  + 3' 16"
UCI America Tour:
Tour of California, Stage 6:  David Zabriskie  30' 35"  Levi Leipheimer  ( + 14"  Tejay van Garderen   + 40"
General classification (after stage 6): (1) Chris Horner   17h 17' 01" (2) Leipheimer + 38" (3) Rory Sutherland  + 1' 38"

Equestrianism
FEI Nations Cup Show Jumping – Promotional League, Europe:
FEI Nations Cup of Denmark in Copenhagen (CSIO 4*):   (David O'Brien, Jennifer Crooks, Alexander Butler, Dermott Lennon)   (Holger Wulschner, Thomas Voss, Janne Friederike Meyer, Jörg Naeve)   (Angelique Hoorn, Suzanne Tepper, Nathalie van der Mei, Jur Vrieling) &  (Guido Hornesch, Donaat Brondeel, Delphine Goemaere, Gregory Wathelet)
Standings (after 3 of 7 competitions): (1)  &  18.5 points (3)  17.5

Ice hockey
Stanley Cup Playoffs:
Western Conference Finals: (series best-of-7; seeds in parentheses)
Game 3 in San Jose: (2) San Jose Sharks 4, (1) Vancouver Canucks 3. Canucks lead series 2–1.
Memorial Cup in Mississauga, Ontario:
Round robin: Saint John Sea Dogs 4, Mississauga St. Michael's Majors 3.

Rugby union
Amlin Challenge Cup Final in Cardiff: Harlequins  19–18  Stade Français
Harlequins win the Cup for a record third time.

Surfing
Men's World Tour:
Billabong Rio Pro at Rio de Janeiro, Brazil: (1) Adriano De Souza  (2) Taj Burrow  (3) Jeremy Flores  & Bede Durbidge 
Standings (after 3 of 11 events): (1) De Souza 20,500 points (2) Joel Parkinson  19,200 (3) Kelly Slater  16,950

May 19, 2011 (Thursday)

Basketball
NBA Playoffs:
Western Conference Finals (series best-of-7; seeds in parentheses):
Game 2 in Dallas: (4) Oklahoma City Thunder 106, (3) Dallas Mavericks 100. Series tied 1–1.

Cycling
Grand Tours:
Giro d'Italia, Stage 12:  Mark Cavendish  4h 17' 25"  Davide Appollonio  s.t.  Alessandro Petacchi   s.t.
General classification (after stage 12): (1) Alberto Contador   44h 55' 16" (2) Kanstantsin Sivtsov  + 59" (3) Vincenzo Nibali  + 1' 21"
UCI America Tour:
Tour of California, Stage 5:  Peter Sagan   5h 16' 03"  Leigh Howard  s.t.  Ben Swift  s.t.
General classification (after stage 5): (1) Chris Horner   16h 45' 35" (2) Levi Leipheimer  + 1' 15" (3) Tom Danielson  + 1' 22"

Darts
Premier League Play-offs in London, England:
Semi-finals:
Phil Taylor  3–8 Adrian Lewis 
Raymond van Barneveld  6–8 Gary Anderson 
Third place play-off: Taylor 8–6 van Barneveld
Final: Lewis 4–10 Anderson
Anderson becomes the first non-English player to win the title.

Football (soccer)
Copa Libertadores Quarterfinals, second leg (first leg score in parentheses):
Universidad Católica  2–1 (0–2)  Peñarol. 3–3 on points; Peñarol win 3–2 on aggregate.
Cerro Porteño  1–0 (1–1)  Chiapas. Cerro Porteño win 4–1 on points.
 Primera División de México Clausura Liguilla Final, first leg: Monarcas Morelia 1–1 UNAM

Ice hockey
Stanley Cup Playoffs:
Eastern Conference Finals: (series best-of-7; seeds in parentheses)
Game 3 in Tampa: (3) Boston Bruins 2, (5) Tampa Bay Lightning 0. Bruins lead series 2–1.

May 18, 2011 (Wednesday)

Basketball
NBA Playoffs:
Eastern Conference Finals (series best-of-7; seeds in parentheses):
Game 2 in Chicago: (2) Miami Heat 85, (1) Chicago Bulls 75. Series tied 1–1.

Cycling
Grand Tours:
Giro d'Italia, Stage 11:  John Gadret  3h 33' 11"  Joaquim Rodríguez  s.t.  Giovanni Visconti  s.t.
General classification (after stage 11): (1) Alberto Contador   40h 37' 51" (2) Kanstantsin Sivtsov  + 59" (3) Vincenzo Nibali  + 1' 21"
UCI America Tour:
Tour of California, Stage 4:  Chris Horner  3h 27' 51"  Andy Schleck  + 1' 15"  Rory Sutherland  + 1' 15"
General classification (after stage 4): (1) Horner  11h 29' 32" (2) Levi Leipheimer  + 1' 15" (3) Tom Danielson  + 1' 22"

Football (soccer)
Friendly women's internationals (top 10 in FIFA Women's World Rankings):
(1)  2–0 (4) 
(6)  2–1 
UEFA Europa League Final in Dublin: Porto  1–0  Braga
Porto win the tournament for the second time.
Copa Libertadores Quarterfinals, second leg (first leg score in parentheses):
Santos  1–1 (1–0)  Once Caldas. Santos win 4–1 on points.
Libertad  2–4 (0–3)  Vélez Sársfield. Vélez Sársfield win 6–0 on points.
 Canadian Championship Finals, first leg: Vancouver Whitecaps 1–1 Toronto FC
 Cypriot Cup Final in Larnaca: Apollon 1–1 (3–4 pen.) Omonia
Omonia win the Cup for the 13th time.

Ice hockey
Stanley Cup Playoffs:
Western Conference Finals: (series best-of-7; seeds in parentheses)
Game 2 in Vancouver: (1) Vancouver Canucks 7, (2) San Jose Sharks 3. Canucks lead series 2–0.

May 17, 2011 (Tuesday)

Basketball
NBA Playoffs:
Western Conference Finals: (series best-of-7; seeds in parentheses)
Game 1 in Dallas: (3) Dallas Mavericks 121, (4) Oklahoma City Thunder 112. Mavericks lead series 1–0.
NBA Draft Lottery:
The Cleveland Cavaliers, with the second-worst record in the league this season, win the first pick in the upcoming NBA Draft when the pick they received from the Los Angeles Clippers in a trade for Baron Davis is chosen. The Minnesota Timberwolves, with the worst record, are drawn to pick second.

Cycling
Grand Tours:
Giro d'Italia, Stage 10:  Mark Cavendish  4h 00' 49"  Francisco Ventoso  s.t.  Alessandro Petacchi  s.t.
General classification (after stage 10): (1) Alberto Contador   37h 04' 40" (2) Kanstantsin Sivtsov  + 59" (3) Christophe Le Mével  + 1' 19"
UCI America Tour:
Tour of California, Stage 3:  Greg Henderson  5h 14' 29"  Juan José Haedo  s.t.  Thor Hushovd  s.t.
General classification (after stage 3): (1) Henderson  8h 01' 31" (2) Ben Swift  + 0" (3) Peter Sagan   + 4"

Football (soccer)
 Belgian Pro League, final matchday: (teams in bold qualify for the UEFA Champions League, teams in italics qualify for UEFA Europa League)
Genk 1–1 Standard Liège
Final standings: Genk, Standard Liège 51 points, Anderlecht 44, Club Brugge 43.
Genk win the title for the third time.
 First Macedonian Football League, matchday 31: (team in bold qualifies for the UEFA Champions League, team in italics qualifies for UEFA Europa League)
Škendija 2–1 Rabotnički
Metalurg Skopje 0–0 Renova
Standings: Škendija 70 points, Metalurg Skopje 59, Renova 56.
Škendija win the title for the first time.
 Hungarian Cup Final in Budapest: Kecskemét 3–2 Videoton
Kecskemét win the Cup for the first time.

Ice hockey
Stanley Cup Playoffs:
Eastern Conference Finals: (series best-of-7; seeds in parentheses)
Game 2 in Boston: (3) Boston Bruins 6, (5) Tampa Bay Lightning 5. Series tied 1–1.

May 16, 2011 (Monday)

Cycling
UCI America Tour:
Tour of California, Stage 2:  Ben Swift  2h 47' 12"  Peter Sagan  s.t.  Matthew Goss  s.t.
General classification (after stage 2): (1) Swift  2h 47' 02" (2) Sagan  + 4" (3) Goss + 6"

Football (soccer)
 Israeli Premier League, matchday 34: (team in bold qualifies for the UEFA Champions League, teams in italics qualify for UEFA Europa League)
Maccabi Haifa 2–0 Hapoel Ironi Kiryat Shmona
Standings: Maccabi Haifa 44 points, Hapoel Tel Aviv 38, Maccabi Tel Aviv 32.
Maccabi Haifa win the title for the 12th time.

May 15, 2011 (Sunday)

Athletics
IAAF Diamond League:
Shanghai Golden Grand Prix in Shanghai, China:
Men:
100m: Asafa Powell  9.95
110m hurdles: Liu Xiang  13.07
400m: Calvin Smith Jr.  45.47
1500m: Nixon Chepseba  3:31.42
3000m steeplechase: Brimin Kipruto  8:02.28
Javelin throw: Tero Pitkämäki  85.33m
Long jump: Mitchell Watt  8.44m
Women:
100m: Veronica Campbell-Brown  10.92
400m hurdles: Kaliese Spencer  54.20
800m: Jenny Meadows  2:00.54
5000m: Vivian Cheruiyot  14:31.92
Discus throw: Sandra Perković  65.58m
High jump: Blanka Vlašić  1.94m
Pole vault: Silke Spiegelburg  4.55m
Shot put: Gong Lijiao  19.94m
Triple jump: Yargelis Savigne  14.68m

Auto racing
Sprint Cup Series:
FedEx 400 benefiting Autism Speaks in Dover, Delaware: (1)  Matt Kenseth (Ford; Roush Fenway Racing) (2)  Mark Martin (Chevrolet; Hendrick Motorsports) (3)  Marcos Ambrose (Ford; Richard Petty Motorsports)
Drivers' championship standings (after 11 of 36 races): (1)  Carl Edwards (Ford; Roush Fenway Racing) 416 points (2)  Jimmie Johnson (Chevrolet; Hendrick Motorsports) 392 (3)  Kyle Busch (Toyota; Joe Gibbs Racing) 379
World Touring Car Championship:
Race of Italy in Monza:
Race 1: (1) Rob Huff  (Chevrolet; Chevrolet Cruze (2) Yvan Muller  (Chevrolet; Chevrolet Cruze) (3) Tiago Monteiro  (Sunred Engineering; SEAT León)
Race 2: (1) Huff (2) Muller (3) Kristian Poulsen  (Liqui Moly Team Engstler; BMW 320 TC)
Drivers' championship standings (after 3 of 12 rounds): (1) Huff 120 points (2) Muller 84 (3) Alain Menu  (Chevrolet; Chevrolet Cruze) 79

Basketball
NBA Playoffs (series best-of-7; seeds in parentheses):
Western Conference Semifinals:
Game 7 in Oklahoma City: (4) Oklahoma City Thunder 105, (8) Memphis Grizzlies 90. Thunder win series 4–3.
Eastern Conference Finals:
Game 1 in Chicago: (1) Chicago Bulls 103, (2) Miami Heat 82. Bulls lead series 1–0.
 Greek Cup Final in Ellinikon: Panathinaikos 68–74 Olympiacos
Olympiacos win the Cup for the second successive time and ninth time overall. They also extend their unbeaten record in domestic play this season to 32–0.
 French Cup Final: Chalon-sur-Saône 79–71 Limoges

Cricket
Pakistan in the West Indies:
1st Test in Providence, Guyana; day 4:  226 & 152;  160 & 178 (73 overs). West Indies win by 40 runs, lead the 2-match series 1–0.

Cycling
Grand Tours:
Giro d'Italia, Stage 9:  Alberto Contador  4h 54' 09"  José Rujano  + 3"  Stefano Garzelli  + 50"
General classification (after stage 9): (1) Contador  33h 03' 51" (2) Kanstantsin Sivtsov  + 59" (3) Christophe Le Mével  + 1' 19"
UCI America Tour:
Tour of California, Stage 1: Cancelled due to poor weather conditions.

Equestrianism
Show Jumping – Jumping International de France in La Baule-Escoublac (CSIO 5*):
Grand Prix:  Eric Lamaze  on Hickstead  Pénélope Leprevost  on Mylord Carthago  Carsten-Otto Nagel  on Corradina

Field hockey
Women's Champions Challenge II in Vienna, Austria:
Seventh and eighth place:  2–1 
Fifth and sixth place:  2–1 
Third and fourth place:  2–2 (1–3 pen.)  
Final:   2–1  
Belgium win the title for the first time and qualify for the Hockey Champions Challenge.

Football (soccer)
European Under-17 Championship in Serbia:
Final:  2–5 
The Netherlands win the title for the first time.
Friendly women's internationals (top 10 in FIFA Women's World Rankings):
(6)  1–1 
 Scottish Premier League, final matchday: (team in bold qualifies for the UEFA Champions League, teams in italics qualify for UEFA Europa League)
Kilmarnock 1–5 Rangers
Celtic 4–0 Motherwell
Final standings: Rangers 93 points, Celtic 92, Hearts 63.
Rangers win the title for the third successive time and 54th time overall.
 Eredivisie, final matchday: (teams in bold qualify for the UEFA Champions League, teams in italics qualify for UEFA Europa League)
Ajax 3–1 Twente
Final standings: Ajax 73 points, Twente 71, PSV 69, AZ 59.
Ajax win the title for the 30th time.
 Ekstraklasa, matchday 27: (team in bold qualifies for the UEFA Champions League)
Wisła Kraków 1–0 Cracovia
Standings: Wisła Kraków 53 points, Śląsk Wrocław 43.
Wisła Kraków win the title for the 12th time.
 Liga I, matchday 33 (team in bold qualifies for the UEFA Champions League):
Oțelul Galați 2–1 Politehnica Timișoara
Standings: Oţelul Galaţi 67 points, FC Timişoara 63, Vaslui 62.
Oţelul Galaţi win the title for the first time.
 Campeonato Paulista Finals, second leg (first leg score in parentheses):
Santos 2–1 (0–0) Corinthians. Santos win 2–1 on aggregate.
Santos win the title for the second successive time and 19th time overall.
 Latvian Cup Final in Riga: FK Ventspils 3–1 Liepājas Metalurgs
Ventspils win the Cup for the fifth time.

Golf
PGA Tour:
The Players Championship in Ponte Vedra Beach, Florida:
Winner: K. J. Choi  275 (−13)PO
Choi defeats David Toms  to claim his eighth PGA Tour title, and first since 2008.
European Tour:
Iberdrola Open in Son Servera, Spain:
Winner: Darren Clarke  274 (−6)
Clarke wins his 13th career European Tour title, and first since 2008.

Ice hockey
Men's World Championship in Bratislava, Slovakia:
Bronze medal game:   7–4 
Gold medal game:   1–6  
Finland win the title for the second time.
Stanley Cup Playoffs:
Western Conference Finals: (series best-of-7; seeds in parentheses)
Game 1 in Vancouver: (1) Vancouver Canucks 3, (2) San Jose Sharks 2. Canucks lead series 1–0.

Motorcycle racing
Moto GP:
French Grand Prix in Le Mans, France:
MotoGP: (1) Casey Stoner  (Honda) (2) Andrea Dovizioso  (Honda) (3) Valentino Rossi  (Ducati)
Riders' championship standings (after 4 of 18 races): (1) Jorge Lorenzo  (Yamaha) 78 points (2) Stoner 66 (3) Dani Pedrosa  (Honda) 61
Moto2: (1) Marc Márquez  (Suter) (2) Yuki Takahashi  (Moriwaki) (3) Stefan Bradl  (Kalex)
Riders' championship standings (after 4 of 17 races): (1) Bradl 77 points (2) Julián Simón  (Suter) 49 (3) Andrea Iannone  (Suter) 48
125cc: (1) Maverick Viñales  (Aprilia) (2) Nicolás Terol  (Aprilia) (3) Efrén Vázquez  (Derbi)
Riders' championship standings (after 4 of 17 races): (1) Terol 95 points (2) Sandro Cortese  (Aprilia) 59 (3) Johann Zarco  (Derbi) 53

Rugby union
 Aviva Premiership semi-final: Saracens 12–10 Gloucester

Surfing
Women's World Tour:
Billabong Rio Pro at Rio de Janeiro, Brazil: (1) Carissa Moore  (2) Sally Fitzgibbons  (3) Silvana Lima  & Stephanie Gilmore 
Standings (after 5 of 7 events): (1) Moore 47,000 points (2) Fitzgibbons 41,650 (3) Wright 30,620

Table tennis
World Championships in Rotterdam, Netherlands:
Men's Singles final: Zhang Jike  def. Wang Hao  12–10, 11–7, 6–11, 9–11, 11–5, 14–12
Zhang wins his first world title.
A Chinese man wins the title for the fourth successive time.
Women's Doubles final: Guo Yue / Li Xiaoxia  vs. Ding Ning / Guo Yan  11–8, 11–5, 13–11, 11–8
Guo and Li win their second successive women's doubles title.
Guo wins her fifth world title.
A Chinese team win the title for the 12th successive time.

Tennis
ATP World Tour:
Internazionali BNL d'Italia in Rome, Italy:
Final: Novak Djokovic  def. Rafael Nadal  6–4, 6–4
Djokovic improves his winning streak to 39 matches in all and 37 this season, and defeats Nadal in a final for the fourth time in 2011. Djokovic wins his seventh title of the year and 25th of his career.
WTA Tour:
Internazionali BNL d'Italia in Rome, Italy:
Final: Maria Sharapova  def. Samantha Stosur  6–2, 6–4
Sharapova wins her 23rd career title.

May 14, 2011 (Saturday)

Auto racing
Nationwide Series:
5-hour Energy 200 in Dover, Delaware: (1)  Carl Edwards (Ford; Roush Fenway Racing) (2)  Kyle Busch (Toyota; Joe Gibbs Racing) (3)  Reed Sorenson (Chevrolet; Turner Motorsports)
Drivers' championship standings (after 11 of 34 races): (1)  Elliott Sadler (Chevrolet; Kevin Harvick Incorporated) 379 points (2) Sorenson 369 (3)  Jason Leffler (Chevrolet; Turner Motorsports) 364

Cricket
Pakistan in the West Indies:
1st Test in Providence, Guyana; day 3:  226 & 152 (61.5 overs; Saeed Ajmal 6/42);  160 & 80/3 (36 overs). Pakistan require another 139 runs with 7 wickets remaining.

Cycling
Grand Tours:
Giro d'Italia, Stage 8:  Oscar Gatto  4h 59' 45"  Alberto Contador  s.t.  Alessandro Petacchi   + 5"
General classification (after stage 8): (1) Pieter Weening   28h 09' 49" (2) Kanstantsin Sivtsov  + 2" (3) Marco Pinotti  + 2"

Field hockey
Women's Champions Challenge II in Vienna, Austria:
Semifinals:
 0–1 
 3–2 (a.e.t.)

Football (soccer)
Friendly women's international (top 10 in FIFA Women's World Rankings):
(1)  2–0 (4) 
 Premier League, matchday 37 (teams in bold qualify for the UEFA Champions League):
Blackburn Rovers 1–1 Manchester United
Standings: Manchester United 77 points, Chelsea 70 (36), Arsenal 67 (36), Manchester City 65 (36).
Manchester United win the Premier League for the 12th time and a record 19th league championship title.
 FA Cup Final in London: Manchester City 1–0 Stoke City
Manchester City win the Cup for the fifth time, and their first since 1969.
 Coupe de France Final in Saint-Denis: Lille 1–0 Paris Saint-Germain
Lille win the Cup for the first time in 56 years and sixth time overall.
 Lithuanian Cup Final in Alytus: Ekranas 4–2 (a.e.t.) Banga
Ekranas win the Cup for the second successive time, and fifth time overall.

Ice hockey
Stanley Cup Playoffs:
Eastern Conference Finals: (series best-of-7; seeds in parentheses)
Game 1 in Boston: (5) Tampa Bay Lightning 5, (3) Boston Bruins 2. Lightning lead series 1–0.

Rugby union
 Aviva Premiership semi-final: Leicester Tigers 11–3 Northampton Saints
 Top 14 quarter-final: Castres 17–18 Montpellier
 Celtic League semi-final: Munster 18–11 Ospreys

Table tennis
World Championships in Rotterdam, Netherlands:
Women's Singles final: Ding Ning  def. Li Xiaoxia  12–10, 13–11, 11–9, 8–11, 8–11, 11–7
Ding wins her first world title, as a Chinese woman wins the title for the ninth successive time.
Men's Doubles final: Ma Long/Xu Xin  def. Chen Qi/Ma Lin  11–3, 11–8, 4–11, 11–4, 11–7
Ma and Xu both win their first world title, as a Chinese team win the title for the tenth successive time.

May 13, 2011 (Friday)

Basketball
NBA Playoffs:
Western Conference Semifinals: (series best-of-7; seeds in parentheses)
Game 6 in Memphis: (8) Memphis Grizzlies 95, (4) Oklahoma City Thunder 83. Series tied 3–3.

Cricket
Pakistan in the West Indies:
1st Test in Providence, Guyana; day 2:  226 (98 overs; Saeed Ajmal 5/69) & 34/2 (10.5 overs);  160 (64.4 overs). West Indies lead by 100 runs with 8 wickets remaining.

Cycling
Grand Tours:
Giro d'Italia, Stage 7:  Bart De Clercq  2h 54' 47"  Michele Scarponi  s.t.  Roman Kreuziger  s.t.
General classification (after stage 7): (1) Pieter Weening   23h 09' 59" (2) Kanstantsin Sivtsov  + 2" (3) Marco Pinotti  + 2"

Equestrianism
FEI Nations Cup Show Jumping:
Nations Cup of France in La Baule-Escoublac (CSIO 5*):   (Shane Sweetnam, Billy Twomey, Cian O'Connor, Cameron Hanley)   (Philippe Le Jeune, Dirk Demeersman, Judy-Ann Melchior, Jos Lansink)   (Carsten-Otto Nagel, Philipp Weishaupt, Thomas Mühlbauer, Marcus Ehning)
FEI Nations Cup Show Jumping – Promotional League, Europe:
Nations Cup of Austria in Linz (CSIO 4*):   (Jörg Oppermann, Jan Sprehe, David Will, Jürgen Kraus)   (Patrick Spits, Peter Devos, Niels Bruynseels, Koen Vereecke)   (Lucia Vizzini, Roberto Arioldi, Fabio Brotto, Davide Kainich) &  (Pedro Veniss, Karina Harbich Johannpeter, Yuri Mansur Guerios, Carlos Motta Ribas)
Standings (after 2 of 7 competitions): (1) Italy & Brazil 12.5 points (3)  9.5

Field hockey
Women's Champions Challenge II in Vienna, Austria:
Fifth to eighth place classification:
 3–2 
 7–0

Football (soccer)
CAF Champions League Second round, second leg (first leg score in parentheses):
ES Sétif  2–0 (1–4)  Cotonsport. Cotonsport win 4–3 on aggregate.
 Divizia Naţională, matchday 37 (team in bold qualifies for the UEFA Champions League):
Dinamo Bendery 0–7 Sheriff Tiraspol
Costuleni 0–1 Dacia Chișinău
Standings: Dacia Chişinău 86 points, Sheriff Tiraspol 77, Milsami 72.
Dacia Chişinău win the title for the first time, ending Sheriff Tiraspol's run of ten consecutive titles.

Ice hockey
Men's World Championship in Bratislava, Slovakia:
Semifinals:
 2–5 
 3–0

Rugby union
 Top 14 quarter-final: Clermont 27–17 Biarritz
 Celtic League semi-final: Leinster 18–3 Ulster

Table tennis
World Championships in Rotterdam, Netherlands:
Mixed Doubles final: Zhang Chao/Cao Zhen  def. Hao Shuai/Mu Zi  11–7, 11–7, 11–9, 9–11, 11–8
Cao wins her second consecutive world title, and Zhang wins his first.
A Chinese couple win the title for the 11th successive time.

May 12, 2011 (Thursday)

Basketball
NBA Playoffs:
Eastern Conference Semifinals: (series best-of-7; seeds in parentheses)
Game 6 in Atlanta: (1) Chicago Bulls 93, (5) Atlanta Hawks 73. Bulls win series 4–2.

Cricket
Pakistan in the West Indies:
1st Test in Providence, Guyana; day 1:  209/9 (90 overs); .

Cycling
Grand Tours:
Giro d'Italia, Stage 6:  Francisco Ventoso  5h 15' 39"  Alessandro Petacchi   s.t.  Roberto Ferrari  s.t.
General classification (after stage 6): (1) Pieter Weening   20h 15' 12" (2) Kanstantsin Sivtsov  + 2" (3) Marco Pinotti  + 2"

Darts
Premier League, week 14 in Newcastle, England (players in bold qualify for the playoffs):
James Wade  8–4 Terry Jenkins 
Mark Webster  4–8 Raymond van Barneveld 
Adrian Lewis  7–7 Gary Anderson 
Phil Taylor  8–3 Simon Whitlock 
Final standings: Taylor 26 points, van Barneveld 18, Anderson 17, Lewis 14, Wade 13, Whitlock 11, Jenkins 8, Webster 5.

Field hockey
Women's Champions Challenge II in Vienna, Austria:
Quarterfinals:
 3–2 
 1–0 
 2–1 
 4–1

Football (soccer)
European Under-17 Championship in Serbia:
Semifinals:
 1–0 
 0–2 
Copa Libertadores Quarterfinals, first leg:
Vélez Sársfield  3–0  Libertad
Chiapas  1–1  Cerro Porteño

Ice hockey
Men's World Championship in Slovakia:
Quarterfinals in Bratislava:
 4–1 
 1–2 
Stanley Cup Playoffs:
Western Conference Semifinals: (series best-of-7; seeds in parentheses)
Game 7 in San Jose: (2) San Jose Sharks 3, (3) Detroit Red Wings 2. Sharks win series 4–3.

May 11, 2011 (Wednesday)

Basketball
NBA Playoffs (all series best-of-7; seeds in parentheses):
Eastern Conference Semifinals:
Game 5 in Miami: (2) Miami Heat 97, (3) Boston Celtics 87. Heat win series 4–1.
Western Conference Semifinals:
Game 5 in Oklahoma City: (4) Oklahoma City Thunder 99, (8) Memphis Grizzlies 72. Thunder lead series 3–2.

Cycling
Grand Tours:
Giro d'Italia, Stage 5:  Pieter Weening  4h 54' 49"  Fabio Duarte  + 8"  José Serpa  + 8"
General classification (after stage 5): (1) Weening  14h 59' 33" (2) Marco Pinotti  + 2" (3) Kanstantsin Sivtsov  + 2"

Football (soccer)
AFC Champions League group stage, matchday 6:
Group A:
Al-Jazira  1–4  Sepahan
Al-Hilal  2–0  Al-Gharafa
Final standings: Sepahan, Al-Hilal 13 points, Al-Gharafa 7, Al-Jazira 1.
Group B:
Pakhtakor  1–1  Al-Sadd
Esteghlal  2–1  Al-Nassr
Final standings: Al-Sadd 10 points, Al-Nassr, Esteghlal 8, Pakhtakor 5.
Group E:
Gamba Osaka  2–0  Tianjin Teda
Jeju United  1–1  Melbourne Victory
Final standings: Gamba Osaka, Tianjin Teda 10 points, Jeju United 7, Melbourne Victory 6.
Group F:
Hangzhou Greentown  1–1  FC Seoul
Al-Ain  3–1  Nagoya Grampus
Final standings: FC Seoul 11 points, Nagoya Grampus 10, Al-Ain 7, Hangzhou Greentown 5.
AFC Cup group stage, matchday 6:
Group A
Dempo  2–1  Al-Ansar
Nasaf Qarshi  7–1  Al-Tilal
Final standings: Nasaf Qarshi 18 points, Dempo 7, Al-Ansar 6, Al-Tilal 4.
Group B
Al-Saqr  0–1  Shurtan Guzar
Al-Qadsia  3–2  Al-Ittihad
Final standings: Al-Qadsia 14 points, Shurtan Guzar 9, Al-Ittihad 8, Al-Saqr 1.
Group E
Al Ahed  2–0  Al-Oruba
Al-Karamah  0–3  Arbil
Final standings: Arbil 14 points, Al Ahed, Al-Oruba, Al-Karamah 6.
Group F
Sriwijaya  3–2  TSW Pegasus
Sông Lam Nghệ An  4–2  VB
Final standings: Sông Lam Nghệ An 12 points, Sriwijaya 10, TSW Pegasus 9, VB 4.
Copa Libertadores Quarterfinals, first leg:
Once Caldas  0–1  Santos
Peñarol  2–0  Universidad Católica
 La Liga, matchday 36 (teams in bold qualify for the UEFA Champions League):
Levante 1–1 Barcelona
Standings: Barcelona 92 points, Real Madrid 86, Valencia 67, Villarreal 62.
Barcelona win their third consecutive title, and their 21st overall.
 Nemzeti Bajnokság I, matchday 28 (team in bold qualifies for the UEFA Champions League):
Videoton 3–1 Kaposvár
Standings: Videoton 58 points, Paksi 50, Ferencváros 46.
Videoton win the title for the first time.
 Turkish Cup Final in Kayseri: Beşiktaş 2–2 (4–3 pen.) Istanbul BB
Beşiktaş win the Cup for the ninth time.
 Serbian Cup Final in Belgrade: Vojvodina 1–2 Partizan. Abandoned after 83 minutes.
Partizan win the Cup for the third time.
 Croatian Cup Final, first leg: Dinamo Zagreb 5–1 Varaždin
 Armenian Cup Final in Yerevan: Shirak 1–4 Mika
Mika win the Cup for a record sixth time.

Ice hockey
Men's World Championship in Slovakia:
Quarterfinals in Bratislava:
 4–0 
 5–2

May 10, 2011 (Tuesday)

Basketball
NBA Playoffs:
Eastern Conference Semifinals: (series best-of-7; seeds in parentheses)
Game 5 in Chicago: (1) Chicago Bulls 95, (5) Atlanta Hawks 83. Bulls lead series 3–2.

Cycling
Grand Tours:
Giro d'Italia, Stage 4: After Wouter Weylandt's fatal crash on Stage 3, the stage is neutralised, and run as an homage to Weylandt and thus would not count towards the overall classification.
General classification (after stage 4): (1) David Millar   10h 04' 29" (2) Ángel Vicioso  + 7" (3) Kanstantsin Sivtsov  + 9"

Field hockey
Women's Champions Challenge II in Vienna, Austria:
Pool A:
 2–1 
 5–1 
Final standings: Chile, Italy, Canada 6 points, Austria 0.
Pool B:
 2–2 
 2–3 
Final standings: Belarus 9 points, Belgium 6, Malaysia, Russia 1.

Football (soccer)
AFC Champions League group stage, matchday 6 (teams in bold advance to the knockout stage):
Group C:
Al-Wahda  2–0  Persepolis
Al-Ittihad  1–1  Bunyodkor
Final standings: Al-Ittihad 11 points, Bunyodkor 9, Al-Wahda 6, Persepolis 5.
Group D:
Al-Rayyan  2–0  Emirates
Zob Ahan  0–1  Al-Shabab
Final standings: Zob Ahan 13 points, Al-Shabab 11, Emirates 6, Al-Rayyan 4.
Group G:
Jeonbuk Hyundai Motors  6–0  Arema
Cerezo Osaka  4–0  Shandong Luneng
Final standings: Jeonbuk Hyundai Motors 15 points, Cerezo Osaka 12, Shandong Luneng 7, Arema 1.
Group H:
Kashima Antlers  2–1  Sydney FC
Shanghai Shenhua  0–3  Suwon Samsung Bluewings
Final standings: Suwon Samsung Bluewings, Kashima Antlers 12 points, Sydney FC 5, Shanghai Shenhua 2.
AFC Cup group stage, matchday 6 (teams in bold advance to the knockout stage):
Group C:
Al-Faisaly  0–0  Duhok
Al-Nasr  0–4  Al-Jaish
Final standings: Duhok, Al-Faisaly, Al-Jaish 11 points, Al-Nasr 0.
Group D:
Al-Talaba  1–2  Al-Kuwait
Al-Suwaiq  1–1  Al-Wehdat
Final standings: Al-Wehdat 14 points, Al-Kuwait 10, Al-Talaba 5, Al-Suwaiq 3.
Group G:
Victory  0–1  Hà Nội T&T
Muangthong United  4–0  Tampines Rovers
Final standings: Muangthong United 14 points, Tampines Rovers 11, Hà Nội T&T 8, Victory 0.
Group H:
Kingfisher East Bengal  1–1  Persipura Jayapura
South China  0–3  Chonburi
Final standings: Chonburi 13 points, Persipura Jayapura 11, South China 5, Kingfisher East Bengal 3.
 Estonian Cup Final in Tallinn: Flora 2–0 Narva Trans
Flora win the Cup for the fifth time.

Ice hockey
Stanley Cup Playoffs:
Western Conference Semifinals: (series best-of-7; seeds in parentheses)
Game 6 in Detroit: (3) Detroit Red Wings 3, (2) San Jose Sharks 1. Series tied 3–3.

May 9, 2011 (Monday)

Basketball
NBA Playoffs (all series best-of-7; seeds in parentheses):
Eastern Conference Semifinals:
Game 4 in Boston: (2) Miami Heat 98, (3) Boston Celtics 90. Heat lead series 3–1.
Western Conference Semifinals:
Game 4 in Memphis: (4) Oklahoma City Thunder 133, (8) Memphis Grizzlies 123 (3OT). Series tied 2–2.

Cycling
Grand Tours:
Giro d'Italia, Stage 3:  Ángel Vicioso  3h 57' 38"  David Millar  s.t.  Pablo Lastras  s.t.
General classification (after stage 3): (1) Millar  10h 04' 29" (2) Vicioso + 7" (3) Kanstantsin Sivtsov  + 9"
 rider Wouter Weylandt is fatally injured in a crash,  from the end of the stage. He is the first rider to be killed in the Giro since Emilio Ravasio in 1986, and the first to be killed in a Grand Tour since Fabio Casartelli in the 1995 Tour de France.

Football (soccer)
European Under-17 Championship in Serbia (teams in bold advance to the semi-finals and qualify for FIFA U-17 World Cup):
Group A:
 3–0 
 1–0 
Final standings: Denmark 9 points, England 4, France 2, Serbia 1.
Group B:
 0–1 
 0–0 
Final standings: Netherlands 7 points, Germany 4, Czech Republic 3, Romania 1.

Ice hockey
Men's World Championship in Slovakia (teams in bold advance to the playoff round):
Qualifying round:
Group E in Bratislava:
 4–1 
 2–3 (SO) 
 2–5 
Final standings: Czech Republic 15 points, Finland 10, Germany 8, Russia 7, Slovakia 3, Denmark 2.
Group F in Košice:
 2–5 
 5–3 
 3–2 
Final standings: Canada 13 points, Sweden 10, Norway 8, United States 7, Switzerland 6, France 1.
Stanley Cup Playoffs:
Western Conference Semifinals: (series best-of-7; seeds in parentheses)
Game 6 in Nashville: (1) Vancouver Canucks 2, (5) Nashville Predators 1. Canucks win series 4–2.

May 8, 2011 (Sunday)

Auto racing
Formula One:
 in Istanbul, Turkey: (1) Sebastian Vettel  (Red Bull-Renault) (2) Mark Webber  (Red Bull-Renault) (3) Fernando Alonso  (Ferrari)
Drivers' championship standings (after 4 of 19 races): (1) Vettel 93 points (2) Lewis Hamilton  (McLaren-Mercedes) 59 (3) Webber 55
World Rally Championship:
Rally d'Italia Sardegna in Olbia, Italy: (1) Sébastien Loeb /Daniel Elena  (Citroën DS3 WRC) (2) Mikko Hirvonen /Jarmo Lehtinen  (Ford Fiesta RS WRC) (3) Petter Solberg /Chris Patterson  (Citroën DS3 WRC)
Drivers' championship standings (after 5 of 13 rallies): (1) Loeb 100 points (2) Hirvonen 93 (3) Sébastien Ogier  (Citroën DS3 WRC) 81

Basketball
Euroleague Final Four in Barcelona, Spain
Third-place playoff: Montepaschi Siena  80–62  Real Madrid
Final: Panathinaikos BC  78–70  Maccabi Tel Aviv
Panathinaikos win the title for the sixth time.
Željko Obradović wins his eighth Euroleague title as head coach.
NBA Playoffs (all series best-of-7; seeds in parentheses):
Eastern Conference Semifinals:
Game 4 in Atlanta: (5) Atlanta Hawks 100, (1) Chicago Bulls 88. Series tied 2–2.
Western Conference Semifinals:
Game 4 in Dallas: (3) Dallas Mavericks 122, (2) Los Angeles Lakers 86. Mavericks win series 4–0.
PBA Commissioner's Cup Finals in Quezon City, Philippines:
Game 6: Talk 'N Text Tropang Texters 99, Barangay Ginebra Kings 96 (OT). Texters win series 4–2.
Talk 'N Text win their second title of the PBA season.

Cycling
Grand Tours:
Giro d'Italia, Stage 2:  Alessandro Petacchi  5h 45' 40"  Mark Cavendish  s.t.  Manuel Belletti  s.t.
General classification (after stage 2): (1) Cavendish  6h 06' 27" (2) Kanstantsin Sivtsov  + 12" (3) Craig Lewis  + 12"

Field hockey
Women's Champions Challenge II in Vienna, Austria:
Pool A:
 0–1 
 4–1 
Standings (after 2 matches): Canada 6 points, Italy, Chile 3, Austria 0.
Pool B:
 0–4 
 4–5 
Standings (after 2 matches): Belgium, Belarus 6 points, Malaysia, Russia 0.

Football (soccer)
CAF Champions League Second round:
Second leg (first leg score in parentheses):
Al-Ahly  1–0 (0–0)  ZESCO United. Al-Ahly win 1–0 on aggregate.
Diaraf  0–1 (0–5)  Espérance ST. Espérance ST win 6–0 on aggregate.
TP Mazembe  2–0 (0–1)  Wydad Casablanca. TP Mazembe win 2–1 on aggregate.
Only leg: Enyimba  1–0  Ittihad
CAF Confederation Cup Second round, second leg (first leg score in parentheses):
Sofapaka  1–0 (1–2)  Saint Eloi Lupopo. 2–2 on aggregate, Sofapaka win on away goals.
USFA  1–0 (0–2)  Sunshine Stars. Sunshine Stars win 2–1 on aggregate.
Motema Pembe  2–1 (1–2)  Haras El Hodood. 3–3 on aggregate, Motema Pembe win 4–3 on penalties.
AS Adema  1–0 (0–3)  Difaa El Jadida. Difaa El Jadida win 3–1 on aggregate.
 KNVB Cup Final in Rotterdam: Twente 3–2 (a.e.t.) Ajax
Twente win the Cup for the third time.
 Slovak Cup Final in Banská Bystrica: Slovan Bratislava 3–3 (5–4 pen.) Žilina
Slovan Bratislava win the Cup for the second successive time and 12th time overall.
 Welsh Cup Final in Llanelli: Bangor City 1–4 Llanelli
Llanelli win the Cup for the first time.
 Copa Constitució Final in Aixovall: Santa Coloma 1–3 (a.e.t.) Sant Julià
Sant Julià win the Cup for the second successive time and third time overall.
 Campeonato Paulista Finals, first leg: Corinthians 0–0 Santos

Golf
Senior majors:
Regions Tradition in Birmingham, Alabama:
Leaderboard after final round: (T1) Tom Lehman  & Peter Senior  275 (−13) (3) Loren Roberts  277 (−11)
Lehman defeats Senior on the second playoff hole to win his second senior major, his third Champions Tour title of the season, and fifth of his career.
PGA Tour:
Wells Fargo Championship in Charlotte, North Carolina:
Winner: Lucas Glover  273 (−15)PO
Glover defeats Jonathan Byrd  on the first playoff hole to win his third PGA Tour title.
European Tour:
Open de España in Seville, Spain:
Winner: Thomas Aiken  278 (−10)
Aiken wins his first European Tour title.

Ice hockey
Men's World Championship in Slovakia:
Qualifying round (teams in bold advance to the playoff round):
Group E in Bratislava:  3–2 
Standings (after 4 games): Czech Republic 12 points,  8, Russia 6,  2,  0.
Group F in Košice:  2–0 
Standings (after 4 games): , Sweden 10 points,  7,  5, Switzerland 3,  1.
Relegation round: (teams in strike are relegated to Division I in 2012)
 1–7  in Bratislava
 4–1  in Košice
Final standings: Belarus, Latvia 6 points, Slovenia, Austria 3.
Stanley Cup Playoffs:
Western Conference Semifinals: (series best-of-7; seeds in parentheses)
Game 5 in San Jose: (3) Detroit Red Wings 4, (2) San Jose Sharks 3. Sharks lead series 3–2.

Motorcycle racing
Superbike:
Monza World Championship round in Monza, Italy:
Race 1: (1) Eugene Laverty  (Yamaha YZF-R1) (2) Max Biaggi  (Aprilia RSV4) (3) Leon Haslam  (BMW S1000RR)
Race 2: (1) Laverty (2) Marco Melandri  (Yamaha YZF-R1) (3) Michel Fabrizio  (Suzuki GSX-R1000)
Riders' championship standings (after 4 of 13 rounds): (1) Carlos Checa  (Ducati 1198) 145 points (2) Melandri 118 (3) Biaggi 117
Supersport:
Monza World Championship round in Monza, Italy: (1) Chaz Davies  (Yamaha YZF-R6) (2) Luca Scassa  (Yamaha YZF-R6) (3) Fabien Foret  (Honda CBR600RR)
Riders' championship standings (after 4 of 12 rounds): (1) Davies & Scassa 70 points (3) Broc Parkes  (Kawasaki Ninja ZX-6R) 60

Tennis
ATP World Tour:
Mutua Madrid Open in Madrid, Spain:
Final: Novak Djokovic  def. Rafael Nadal  7–5, 6–4
Djokovic improves his winning streak to 34 matches in all and 32 this season, and defeats Nadal in a final for the third time in 2011. He also ends Nadal's 37-match winning streak on clay dating back to the 2009 French Open. Djokovic wins his sixth title of the year and 24th of his career.
WTA Tour:
Mutua Madrid Open in Madrid, Spain:
Final: Petra Kvitová  def. Victoria Azarenka  7–6(3), 6–4
Kvitová wins her third title of the year and fourth of her career.

May 7, 2011 (Saturday)

Auto racing
Sprint Cup Series:
Showtime Southern 500 in Darlington, South Carolina: (1)  Regan Smith (Chevrolet; Furniture Row Racing) (2)  Carl Edwards (Ford; Roush Fenway Racing) (3)  Brad Keselowski (Dodge; Penske Racing)
Drivers' championship standings (after 10 of 36 races): (1) Edwards 378 points (2)  Jimmie Johnson (Chevrolet; Hendrick Motorsports) 355 (3)  Kyle Busch (Toyota; Joe Gibbs Racing) 339
Intercontinental Le Mans Cup:
1000 km of Spa at Spa, Belgium: (1)  #7 Peugeot Sport Total (Alexander Wurz , Anthony Davidson , Marc Gené ) (2)  #8 Peugeot Sport Total (Franck Montagny , Stéphane Sarrazin , Nicolas Minassian ) (3)  #3 Audi Sport North America (Allan McNish , Rinaldo Capello , Tom Kristensen )

Basketball
NBA Playoffs (all series best-of-7; seeds in parentheses):
Eastern Conference Semifinals:
Game 3 in Boston: (3) Boston Celtics 97, (2) Miami Heat 81. Heat lead series 2–1.
Western Conference Semifinals:
Game 3 in Memphis: (8) Memphis Grizzlies 101, (4) Oklahoma City Thunder 93 (OT). Grizzlies lead series 2–1.

Cycling
Grand Tours:
Giro d'Italia, Stage 1:   20' 59"   + 10"   + 22"
General classification (after stage 1): (1) Marco Pinotti   20' 59" (2) Lars Bak  + 0" (3) Kanstantsin Sivtsov  + 0"

Equestrianism
Show jumping – Global Champions Tour:
2nd Competition in Valencia (CSI 5*):  Billy Twomey  on Je t'aime Flamenco  Ludger Beerbaum  on Gotha FRH  Maikel van der Vleuten  on Verdi
Standings (after 2 of 10 competitions): (1) Álvaro de Miranda Neto  66 points (2) Denis Lynch  64 (2) Lars Nieberg  58

Field hockey
Women's Champions Challenge II in Vienna, Austria:
Pool A:
 2–1 
 2–1 
Pool B:
 0–4 
 4–3

Football (soccer)
CAF Champions League Second round:
Second leg (first leg score in parentheses):
MC Alger  3–2 (1–1)  Inter Luanda. MC Alger win 4–3 on aggregate.
Club Africain  1–1 (0–1)  Al-Hilal. Abandoned due to crowd violence. Al-Hilal advance to the group stage.
First leg: Cotonsport  4–1  ES Sétif
Only leg: Raja Casablanca  1–1 (5–4 pen.)  ASEC Mimosas
CAF Confederation Cup Second round, second leg (first leg score in parentheses):
1º de Agosto  1–0 (1–1)  FUS Rabat. 1º de Agosto win 2–1 on aggregate.
Al-Khartoum  2–0 (1–5)  Maghreb Fez. Maghreb Fez win 5–3 on aggregate.
 Serie A, matchday 36 (teams in bold qualify for the UEFA Champions League):
Roma 0–0 Milan
Standings: Milan 78 points (36 matches), Internazionale 69 (35), Napoli 68 (35).
Milan win the Scudetto for the 18th time and their first since 2003–04.
 Premier League, matchday 28 (teams in bold qualify for the UEFA Champions League, teams in italics qualify for the UEFA Europa League):
Zorya Luhansk 0–1 Dnipro
Karpaty Lviv 1–2 FC Dynamo Kyiv
Shakhtar Donetsk 2–0 Metalurh Donetsk
Standings: Shakhtar Donetsk 70 points, Dynamo Kyiv 62, Dnipro Dnipropetrovsk 53.
Shakhtar win the title for the second successive time and sixth time overall.
 Irish Cup Final in Belfast: Crusaders 1–2 Linfield
Linfield win the Cup for the second successive time and 41st time overall.

Golf
Senior majors:
Regions Tradition in Birmingham, Alabama:
Leaderboard after third round (all USA): (1) Mark Calcavecchia 204 (−12) (2) Jay Haas 205 (−11) (T3) Tom Pernice Jr. & Tom Lehman 206 (−10)

Horse racing
U.S. Thoroughbred Triple Crown:
Kentucky Derby in Louisville:  Animal Kingdom (trainer: H. Graham Motion; jockey: John R. Velazquez)  Nehro (trainer: Steve Asmussen; jockey: Corey Nakatani)  Mucho Macho Man (trainer: Katherine Ritvo; jockey: Rajiv Maragh)

Ice hockey
Men's World Championship in Slovakia:
Qualifying round (teams in bold advance to the playoff round):
Group E in Bratislava:
 4–3 (SO) 
 2–1 
Standings:  9 points (3 games), Finland, Germany 8 (4),  6 (3), Denmark 2 (4), Slovakia 0 (4).
Group F in Košice:
 2–3 
 3–2 
Standings: Canada 10 points (4 games),  7 (3), United States 7 (4), Norway 5 (4),  3 (3), France 1 (4).
Relegation round:
 3–2  in Bratislava
 3–6  in Košice
Standings (after 2 games): Belarus, Slovenia, Latvia, Austria 3 points.
Stanley Cup Playoffs:
Western Conference Semifinals: (series best-of-7; seeds in parentheses)
Game 5 in Vancouver: (5) Nashville Predators 4, (1) Vancouver Canucks 3. Canucks lead series 3–2.

May 6, 2011 (Friday)

Athletics
IAAF Diamond League:
Qatar Athletic Super Grand Prix in Doha, Qatar:
Men:
200m: Walter Dix  20.06
400m hurdles: L. J. van Zyl  48.11
800m: Asbel Kiprop  1:44.74
1500m: Nixon Kiplimo Chepseba  3:31.84
3000m: Yenew Alamirew  7:27.26
Discus throw: Gerd Kanter  67.49m
High jump: Jesse Williams  2.33m
Javelin throw: Petr Frydrych  85.32m
Pole vault: Malte Mohr  5.81m
Shot put: Dylan Armstrong  21.38m
Triple jump: Teddy Tamgho  17.49m
Women:
100m hurdles: Kellie Wells  12.58
200m: LaShauntea Moore  22.83
400m: Allyson Felix  50.33
1500m: Anna Mishchenko  4:03.00
3000m steeplechase: Milcah Chemos Cheywa  9:16.44
Long jump: Funmi Jimoh  6.88m

Auto racing
Nationwide Series:
Royal Purple 200 in Darlington, South Carolina: (1)  Kyle Busch (Toyota; Joe Gibbs Racing) (2)  Denny Hamlin (Toyota; Joe Gibbs Racing) (3)  Elliott Sadler (Chevrolet; Kevin Harvick Incorporated)
Drivers' championship standings (after 10 of 34 races): (1)  Justin Allgaier (Chevrolet; Turner Motorsports) 346 points (2) Sadler 341 (3)  Jason Leffler (Chevrolet; Turner Motorsports) 331

Basketball
Euroleague Final Four in Barcelona, Spain:
Semifinals:
Panathinaikos BC  77–69  Montepaschi Siena
Panathinaikos reach the final for the seventh time.
Maccabi Tel Aviv  82–63  Real Madrid
Maccabi Tel Aviv reach the final for the 14th time, equalling the record with Real Madrid.
Maccabi and Panathinaikos will meet in a repeat of 2000 and 2001 finals.
NBA Playoffs (all series best-of-7; seeds in parentheses):
Eastern Conference Semifinals:
Game 3 in Atlanta: (1) Chicago Bulls 99, (5) Atlanta Hawks 82. Bulls lead series 2–1.
Western Conference Semifinals:
Game 3 in Dallas: (3) Dallas Mavericks 98, (2) Los Angeles Lakers 92. Mavericks lead series 3–0.

Football (soccer)
European Under-17 Championship in Serbia (teams in bold advance to the semi-finals and qualify for FIFA U-17 World Cup):
Group A:
 1–1 
 2–0 
Standings (after 2 matches): Denmark 6 points, France 2, Serbia, England 1.
Group B:
 1–1 
 1–0 
Standings (after 2 matches): Netherlands 6 points, Czech Republic 2, Romania, Germany 1.
CAF Confederation Cup Second round, second leg (first leg score in parentheses):
JS Kabylie  3–0 (0–3)  Missile. 3–3 on aggregate; JS Kabylie win 3–0 on penalties.

Golf
Senior majors:
Regions Tradition in Birmingham, Alabama:
Leaderboard after second round (all USA): (1) Mark Calcavecchia 133 (−11) (2) Kenny Perry 136 (−8) (T3) Michael Allen & Jay Haas 137 (−7)

Ice hockey
Men's World Championship in Slovakia (teams in bold advance to the playoff round):
Qualifying round:
Group E in Bratislava:
 4–5 (SO) 
 3–2 
Standings (after 3 games): Czech Republic 9 points, Germany 7,  6, Finland 5, Slovakia,  0.
Group F in Košice:
 4–3 (SO) 
 4–0 
Standings (after 3 games): Canada, Sweden 7 points,  5, United States 4,  3, France 1.
Stanley Cup Playoffs (all series best-of-7; seeds in parentheses):
Eastern Conference Semifinals:
Game 4 in Boston: (3) Boston Bruins 5, (2) Philadelphia Flyers 1. Bruins win series 4–0.
Western Conference Semifinals:
Game 4 in Detroit: (3) Detroit Red Wings 4, (2) San Jose Sharks 3. Sharks lead series 3–1.

Surfing
Women's World Tour:
Commonwealth Bank Beachley Classic at Dee Why, Australia: (1) Carissa Moore  (2) Sofía Mulánovich  (3) Sally Fitzgibbons  & Stephanie Gilmore 
Standings (after 4 of 7 events): (1) Moore 37,000 points (2) Fitzgibbons 33,650 (3) Wright 25,240

Taekwondo
World Championships in Gyeongju, South Korea:
Men:
−63 kg:  Lee Dae-Hoon   Michael Harvey   Nacha Punthong  & Le Huynh Chau 
−87 kg:  Yousef Karami   Cha Dong-Min   Jon García  & Carlo Molfetta 
+87 kg:  Jo Chol-Ho   Akmal Irgashev   Kourosh Rajoli  & Andreas Stylianou 
Women:
−73 kg:  Gwladys Épangue   Oh Hye-Ri   Milica Mandić  & Anastasia Baryshnikova 
+73 kg:  Anne-Caroline Graffe   An Sae-Bom   Rosana Simón  & Olga Ivanova

May 5, 2011 (Thursday)

Cricket
Pakistan in the West Indies:
5th ODI in Providence, Guyana:  139 (41.2 overs);  140/0 (23.3 overs). West Indies win by 10 wickets; Pakistan win 5-match series 3–2.

Darts
Premier League, week 13 in Bournemouth, England (players in bold qualify for the playoffs):
Simon Whitlock  7–7 Mark Webster 
Gary Anderson  4–8 Raymond van Barneveld 
Terry Jenkins  3–8 Adrian Lewis 
James Wade  4–8 Phil Taylor 
Standings (after 13 matches): Taylor 24 points, Anderson, van Barneveld 16, Lewis 13, Whitlock, Wade 11, Jenkins 8, Webster 5.

Football (soccer)
UEFA Europa League Semi-finals, second leg (first leg score in parentheses):
Braga  1–0 (1–2)  Benfica. 2–2 on aggregate; Braga win on away goals.
Braga reach a European final for the first time.
Villarreal  3–2 (1–5)  Porto. Porto win 7–4 on aggregate.
Porto reach the final for the second time.
Copa Libertadores Round of 16, second leg (first leg score in parentheses):
Junior  3–3 (1–1)  Chiapas. 2–2 on points, 4–4 on aggregate; Jaguares win on away goals.
Cerro Porteño  0–0 (0–0)  Estudiantes. 2–2 on points, 0–0 on aggregate; Cerro Porteño win 5–3 on penalties.
LDU Quito  0–2 (0–3)  Vélez Sársfield. Vélez Sársfield win 6–0 on points.

Golf
Senior majors:
Regions Tradition in Birmingham, Alabama:
Leaderboard after first round (USA unless indicated): (1) Tom Lehman 67 (−5) (T2) Mark Calcavecchia, Wayne Levi, Lu Chien-soon  & Nick Price  68 (−4)

Ice hockey
Men's World Championship in Slovakia:
Qualifying round:
Group E in Bratislava:  4–3 
Standings: ,  6 points (2 games), Russia 6 (3),  3 (2),  0 (2), Denmark 0 (3).
Group F in Košice:  2–3 
Standings:  5 points (2 games), Norway 5 (3),  4 (2),  3 (2), Switzerland 3 (3),  1 (2).
Relegation round:
 5–2  in Bratislava
 7–2  in Košice
Stanley Cup Playoffs:
Western Conference Semifinals: (series best-of-7; seeds in parentheses)
Game 4 in Nashville: (1) Vancouver Canucks 4, (5) Nashville Predators 2. Canucks lead series 3–1.

Taekwondo
World Championships in Gyeongju, South Korea:
Men:
−54 kg:  Chutchawal Khawlaor   Park Ji-woong   Seyfula Magmedov  & Meisam Bagheri 
−74 kg:  Alireza Nasr Azadani   Patiwat Thongsalap   Ismaël Coulibaly  & Rıdvan Baygut 
Women −46 kg:  Kim So-hui   Li Zhaoyi   Rukiye Yıldırım  & Sümeyye Manz

May 4, 2011 (Wednesday)

Basketball
NBA Playoffs (all series best-of-7; seeds in parentheses):
Eastern Conference Semifinals:
Game 2 in Chicago: (1) Chicago Bulls 86, (5) Atlanta Hawks 73. Series tied 1–1.
Western Conference Semifinals:
Game 2 in Los Angeles: (3) Dallas Mavericks 93, (2) Los Angeles Lakers 81. Mavericks lead series 2–0.

Football (soccer)
UEFA Champions League Semi-finals, second leg (first leg score in parentheses):
Manchester United  4–1 (2–0)  Schalke 04. Manchester United win 6–1 on aggregate.
Manchester United reach the final for the third time in four years, and fifth time overall.
Copa Libertadores Round of 16, second leg (first leg score in parentheses):
Cruzeiro  0–2 (2–1)  Once Caldas. 3–3 on points; Once Caldas win 3–2 on aggregate.
Libertad  3–0 (1–3)  Fluminense. 3–3 on points; Libertad win 4–3 on aggregate.
Internacional  1–2 (1–1)  Peñarol. Peñarol win 4–1 on points.
Universidad Católica  1–0 (2–1)  Grêmio. Universidad Católica win 6–0 on points.
AFC Champions League group stage, matchday 5 (teams in bold advance to the knockout stage):
Group A:
Sepahan  1–1  Al-Hilal
Al-Gharafa  5–2  Al-Jazira
Standings (after 5 matches): Sepahan, Al-Hilal 10 points, Al-Gharafa 7, Al-Jazira 1.
Group B: Al-Nassr  4–0  Pakhtakor
Standings (after 5 matches):  Al-Sadd 9 points, Al-Nassr 8,  Esteghlal 5, Pakhtakor 4.
Group E:
Melbourne Victory  1–1  Gamba Osaka
Tianjin Teda  3–0  Jeju United
Standings (after 5 matches): Tianjin Teda 10 points, Gamba Osaka 7, Jeju United 6, Melbourne Victory 5.
Group F:
Nagoya Grampus  1–0  Hangzhou Greentown
FC Seoul  3–0  Al-Ain
Standings (after 5 matches): Nagoya Grampus, FC Seoul 10 points, Al-Ain, Hangzhou Greentown 4.
AFC Cup group stage, matchday 5 (teams in bold advance to the knockout stage):
Group A:
Al-Tilal  2–2  Dempo
Al-Ansar  1–4  Nasaf Qarshi
Standings (after 5 matches): Nasaf Qarshi 15 points, Al-Ansar 6, Dempo, Al-Tilal 4.
Group B:
Shurtan Guzar  1–1  Al-Qadsia
Al-Ittihad  2–0  Al-Saqr
Standings (after 5 matches): Al-Qadsia 11 points, Al-Ittihad 8, Shurtan Guzar 6, Al-Saqr 1.
Group E:
Arbil  6–2  Al Ahed
Al-Oruba  1–1  Al-Karamah
Standings (after 5 matches): Arbil 11 points, Al-Karamah, Al-Oruba 6, Al Ahed 3.
Group F:
VB  2–0  Sriwijaya
TSW Pegasus  2–3  Sông Lam Nghệ An
Standings (after 5 matches): TSW Pegasus, Sông Lam Nghệ An 9 points, Sriwijaya 7, VB 4.
 Superliga, matchday 32 (team in bold qualifies for the UEFA Champions League, teams in italics qualify for the UEFA Europa League):
Skënderbeu Korçë 1–0 KS Elbasani
Flamurtari Vlorë – Vllaznia Shkodër — match abandoned after 89 minutes
Standings: Skënderbeu Korçë 73 points (32 matches), Flamurtari Vlorë 66 (31), Vllaznia Shkodër 56 (31).
Skënderbeu Korçë win the title for the second time and their first since 1933.
 Canadian Championship Semifinals, second leg (first leg score in parentheses):
Vancouver Whitecaps 1–1 (a.e.t.) (1–0) Montreal Impact. Whitecaps win 2–1 on aggregate.
Toronto FC 1–0 (3–0) FC Edmonton. Toronto FC win 4–0 on aggregate.

Ice hockey
Men's World Championship in Slovakia (teams in bold advance to the qualifying round):
Group C in Košice:
 0–5 
 6–2 
Final standings: Sweden 7 points, United States 6, Norway 5, Austria 0.
Group D in Bratislava:
 3–2 (SO) 
 1–2 
Final standings: Czech Republic 9 points, Finland 5, Denmark, Latvia 2.
Stanley Cup Playoffs (all series best-of-7; seeds in parentheses):
Eastern Conference Semifinals:
Game 3 in Boston: (3) Boston Bruins 5, (2) Philadelphia Flyers 1. Bruins lead series 3–0.
Game 4 in Tampa: (5) Tampa Bay Lightning 5, (1) Washington Capitals 3. Lightning win series 4–0.
Western Conference Semifinals:
Game 3 in Detroit: (2) San Jose Sharks 4, (3) Detroit Red Wings 3 (OT). Sharks lead series 3–0.

Taekwondo
World Championships in Gyeongju, South Korea:
Men −68 kg:  Servet Tazegül   Mohammad Bagheri Motamed   Rohullah Nikpai  & Martin Stamper 
Women:
–57 kg:  Hou Yuzhuo   Jade Jones   Marlène Harnois  & Lim Su-Jeong 
–62 kg:  Rangsiya Nisaisom   Marina Sumić   Karine Sergerie  & Dürdane Altunel

May 3, 2011 (Tuesday)

Basketball
NBA Playoffs (all series best-of-7; seeds in parentheses):
Eastern Conference Semifinals:
Game 2 in Miami: (2) Miami Heat 102, (3) Boston Celtics 91. Heat lead series 2–0.
Western Conference Semifinals:
Game 2 in Oklahoma City: (4) Oklahoma City Thunder 111, (8) Memphis Grizzlies 102. Series tied 1–1.

Football (soccer)
European Under-17 Championship in Serbia:
Group A:
 2–3 
 2–2 
Group B:
 0–2 
 1–1 
UEFA Champions League Semi-finals, second leg (first leg score in parentheses):
Barcelona  1–1 (2–0)  Real Madrid. Barcelona win 3–1 on aggregate.
Barcelona reach the final for the second time in three years, and the seventh time overall.
Copa Libertadores Round of 16, second leg (first leg score in parentheses):
América  0–0 (0–1)  Santos. Santos win 4–1 on points.
AFC Champions League group stage, matchday 5 (teams in bold advance to the knockout stage):
Group B: Al-Sadd  2–2  Esteghlal
Standings: Al-Sadd 9 points (5 matches),  Al-Nassr 5 (4), Esteghlal 5 (5),  Pakhtakor 4 (4).
Group C:
Persepolis  3–2  Al-Ittihad
Bunyodkor  3–2  Al-Wahda
Standings (after 5 matches): Al-Ittihad 10 points, Bunyodkor 8, Persepolis 5, Al-Wahda 3.
Group D:
Emirates  0–1  Zob Ahan
Al-Shabab  1–0  Al-Rayyan
Standings (after 5 matches): Zob Ahan 13 points, Al-Shabab 8, Emirates 6, Al-Rayyan 1.
Group G:
Arema  0–4  Cerezo Osaka
Shandong Luneng  1–2  Jeonbuk Hyundai Motors
Standings (after 5 matches): Jeonbuk Hyundai Motors 12 points, Cerezo Osaka 9, Shandong Luneng 7, Arema 1.
Group H:
Kashima Antlers  2–0  Shanghai Shenhua
Suwon Samsung Bluewings  3–1  Sydney FC
Standings (after 5 matches): Suwon Samsung Bluewings, Kashima Antlers 9 points, Sydney FC 5, Shanghai Shenhua 2.
AFC Cup group stage, matchday 5 (teams in bold advance to the knockout stage):
Group C:
Duhok  1–0  Al-Nasr
Al-Jaish  1–1  Al-Faisaly
Standings (after 5 matches): Duhok, Al-Faisaly 10 points, Al-Jaish 8, Al-Nasr 0.
Group D:
Al-Wehdat  0–0  Al-Talaba
Al-Kuwait  0–0  Al-Suwaiq
Standings (after 5 matches): Al-Wehdat 13 points, Al-Kuwait 7, Al-Talaba 5, Al-Suwaiq 2.
Group G:
Hà Nội T&T  0–0  Muangthong United
Tampines Rovers  4–0  Victory
Standings (after 5 matches): Muangthong United, Tampines Rovers 11 points, Hà Nội T&T 5, Victory 0.
Group H:
Persipura Jayapura  4–2  South China
Chonburi  4–0  Kingfisher East Bengal
Standings (after 5 matches): Chonburi, Persipura Jayapura 10 points, South China 5, Kingfisher East Bengal 2.
 Polish Cup Final in Bydgoszcz: Lech Poznań 1–1 (4–5 pen.) Legia Warszawa
Legia win the Cup for the 14th time.

Ice hockey
Men's World Championship in Slovakia (teams in bold advance to the qualifying round):
Group A in Bratislava:
 2–3 (SO) 
 4–3 
Final standings: Germany 8 points, Russia 6, Slovakia 3, Slovenia 1.
Group B in Košice:
 4–3 (OT) 
 2–1 (OT) 
Final standings: Canada 8 points, Switzerland 6, France 3, Belarus 1.
Stanley Cup Playoffs (all series best-of-7; seeds in parentheses):
Eastern Conference Semifinals:
Game 3 in Tampa: (5) Tampa Bay Lightning 4, (1) Washington Capitals 3. Lightning lead series 3–0.
Western Conference Semifinals:
Game 3 in Nashville: (1) Vancouver Canucks 3, (5) Nashville Predators 2 (OT). Canucks lead series 2–1.

Taekwondo
World Championships in Gyeongju, South Korea:
Men −80 kg:  Farzad Abdollahi   Yunus Sarı   Issam Chernoubi  & Ramin Azizov 
Women:
–53 kg:  Ana Zaninović   Lamyaa Bekkali   Hatice Kübra Yangın  & Lee Hye-Young 
–67 kg:  Sarah Stevenson   Guo Yunfei   Hwang Kyung-Seon  & Helena Fromm

May 2, 2011 (Monday)

Auto racing
IndyCar Series:
Itaipava São Paulo Indy 300 in São Paulo, Brazil: (1) Will Power  (Team Penske) (2) Graham Rahal  (Chip Ganassi Racing) (3) Ryan Briscoe  (Team Penske)
Drivers' championship standings (after 4 of 17 races): (1) Power 168 points (2) Dario Franchitti  (Chip Ganassi Racing) 154 (3) Oriol Servià  (Newman/Haas Racing) 110

Basketball
NBA Playoffs (all series best-of-7; seeds in parentheses):
Eastern Conference Semifinals:
Game 1 in Chicago: (5) Atlanta Hawks 103, (1) Chicago Bulls 95. Hawks lead series 1–0.
Western Conference Semifinals:
Game 1 in Los Angeles: (3) Dallas Mavericks 96, (2) Los Angeles Lakers 94. Mavericks lead series 1–0.

Cricket
Pakistan in the West Indies:
4th ODI in Bridgetown, Barbados:  248/9 (50 overs; Mohammad Hafeez 121);  154/4 (29.5/39 overs). West Indies win by 1 run (D/L); Pakistan lead 5-match series 3–1.

Ice hockey
Men's World Championship in Slovakia (teams in bold advance to the qualifying round):
Group C in Košice:
 4–2 
 3–0 
Standings (after 2 games): United States 6 points, Sweden 4, Norway 2, Austria 0.
Group D in Bratislava:
 6–0 
 2–3 (SO) 
Standings (after 2 games): Czech Republic 6 points, Finland 5, Latvia 1, Denmark 0.
Stanley Cup Playoffs:
Eastern Conference Semifinals: (series best-of-7; seeds in parentheses)
Game 2 in Philadelphia: (3) Boston Bruins 3, (2) Philadelphia Flyers 2 (OT). Bruins lead series 2–0.

Snooker
World Championship in Sheffield, England, final:
Judd Trump  15–18 John Higgins 
Higgins becomes the fourth player to win four world titles in the modern era, winning his sixth title of the season and his 24th career ranking title.

Taekwondo
World Championships in Gyeongju, South Korea:
Men −58 kg:  Joel González   Rui Bragança   Wei Chen-yang  & Gabriel Mercedes 
Women −49 kg:  Wu Jingyu   Yang Shu-chun   Brigitte Yagüe  & Sanaa Atabrour

May 1, 2011 (Sunday)

Auto racing
IndyCar Series:
Itaipava São Paulo Indy 300 in São Paulo, Brazil: Due to persistent rain, the race was called for the day after 14 of the scheduled 75 laps, and will resume on May 2.
V8 Supercars:
Trading Post Perth Challenge in Perth, Western Australia:
Race 8: (1) Jason Bright  (Brad Jones Racing, Holden VE Commodore) (2) Jamie Whincup  (Triple Eight Race Engineering, Holden VE Commodore) (3) Jason Bargwanna  (Brad Jones Racing, Holden VE Commodore)
During the start of the race, there was a violent impact between Karl Reindler  (Britek Motorsport, Holden VE Commodore) and Steve Owen  (Paul Morris Motorsport, Holden VE Commodore) after Reindler stalled his #21 VE Commodore on the grid and Owen then collided with the back of Reindler's car at approximately 150 km/h, splitting the fuel cell and igniting a fireball which left Reindler with minor burns to his hands and face; Owen escaped unharmed. The race was subsequently red-flagged while cleanup began.
Race 9: (1) Whincup (2) Bright (3) Garth Tander  (Holden Racing Team, Holden VE Commodore)
Drivers' championship standings (after 9 of 27 races): (1) Whincup 946 points (2) Craig Lowndes  (Triple Eight Race Engineering, Holden VE Commodore) 804 (3) Tander 737

Badminton
BWF Super Series:
India Super Series in New Delhi:
Men's singles: Lee Chong Wei  def. Peter Gade  21–12, 12–21, 21–15
Women's singles: Porntip Buranaprasertsuk  def. Bae Yeon-ju  21–13. 21–16
Men's doubles: Hirokatsu Hashimoto /Noriyasu Hirata  def. Angga Pratama /Rian Agung Saputro  21–17, 21–9
Women's doubles: Miyuki Maeda /Satoko Suetsuna  def. Mizuki Fujii /Reika Kakiiwa  26–24, 21–15
Mixed doubles: Tontowi Ahmad /Liliyana Natsir  def. Fran Kurniawan /Pia Zebadiah Bernadet  21–18, 23–21

Basketball
EuroChallenge Final Four in Ostend, Belgium:
Third place: Spartak Saint Petersburg  92–94   Telenet Oostende (OT)
Championship:  Lokomotiv–Kuban Krasnodar  77–83   Krka Novo Mesto
Krka become the first Slovenian team to win the EuroChallenge.
NBA Playoffs (all series best-of-7; seeds in parentheses):
Eastern Conference Semifinals:
Game 1 in Miami: (2) Miami Heat 99, (3) Boston Celtics 90. Heat lead series 1–0.
Western Conference Semifinals:
Game 1 in Oklahoma City: (8) Memphis Grizzlies 114, (4) Oklahoma City Thunder 101. Grizzlies lead series 1–0.

Cycling
UCI World Tour:
Tour de Romandie, stage 5:  Ben Swift  3h 50' 51"  Davide Viganò  s.t.  Óscar Freire  s.t.
Final general classification: (1) Cadel Evans   16h 51' 49" (2) Tony Martin  + 18" (3) Alexander Vinokourov  + 19"
World Tour standings (after 13 of 27 races): (1) Philippe Gilbert  356 points (2) Fabian Cancellara  236 (3) Evans 232

Equestrianism
FEI World Cup Finals in Leipzig, Germany:
Show jumping Final: Christian Ahlmann  on Taloubet Z  Eric Lamaze  on Hickstead  Jeroen Dubbeldam  on Simon
Four-in-hand driving Final:  Boyd Exell   József Dobrovitz   IJsbrand Chardon 
Rolex Kentucky Three Day Eventing in Lexington, Kentucky, USA (CCI 4*):  Mary King  on Kings Temptress  Mary King on Fernhill Urco  Sinead Halpin  on Manoir de Carneville

Football (soccer)
African Youth Championship in South Africa:
Third place playoff:  0–1  
Final:   2–3 (a.e.t.)  
Nigeria win the title for the sixth time.
 Premier League, matchday 29 (team in bold qualifies for the UEFA Champions League, team in italics qualifies for the UEFA Europa League):
Qarabağ 2–2 Baku
AZAL 1–3 Neftchi Baku
Standings: Neftchi Baku 65 points, Khazar Lankaran 55, Qarabağ 54.
Neftchi win the title for the sixth time and their first since 2004–05.

Golf
PGA Tour:
Zurich Classic of New Orleans in Avondale, Louisiana:
Winner: Bubba Watson  273 (−15)PO
Watson defeats Webb Simpson  on the second playoff hole to win his third PGA Tour title.
European Tour:
Ballantine's Championship in Jeju, South Korea:
Winner: Lee Westwood  276 (−12)
The current World #1 wins his 21st European Tour title and first since 2009.
LPGA Tour:
Avnet LPGA Classic in Mobile, Alabama:
Winner: Maria Hjorth  278 (−10)
Hjorth wins her fifth career LPGA Tour title.

Ice hockey
Men's World Championship in Slovakia (teams in bold advance to the qualifying round):
Group A in Bratislava:
 6–4 
 3–4 
Standings (after 2 games): Germany 6 points, Slovakia, Russia 3, Slovenia 0.
Group B in Košice:
 9–1 
 4–1 
Standings (after 2 games): Canada 6 points, Switzerland 5, France 1, Belarus 0.
Stanley Cup Playoffs (all series best-of-7; seeds in parentheses):
Eastern Conference Semifinals:
Game 2 in Washington: (5) Tampa Bay Lightning 3, (1) Washington Capitals 2 (OT). Lightning lead series 2–0.
Western Conference Semifinals:
Game 2 in San Jose: (2) San Jose Sharks 2, (3) Detroit Red Wings 1. Sharks lead series 2–0.

Motorcycle racing
Moto GP:
Portuguese Grand Prix in Estoril, Portugal:
MotoGP: (1) Dani Pedrosa  (Honda) (2) Jorge Lorenzo  (Yamaha) (3) Casey Stoner  (Honda)
Riders' championship standings (after 3 of 18 races): (1) Lorenzo 65 points (2) Pedrosa 61 (3) Stoner 41
Moto2: (1) Stefan Bradl  (Kalex) (2) Julián Simón  (Suter) (3) Yuki Takahashi  (Moriwaki)
Riders' championship standings (after 3 of 17 races): (1) Bradl 61 points (2) Andrea Iannone  (Suter) 48 (3) Simone Corsi  (FTR) 37
125cc: (1) Nicolás Terol  (Aprilia) (2) Sandro Cortese  (Aprilia) (3) Johann Zarco  (Derbi)
Riders' championship standings (after 3 of 17 races): (1) Terol 75 points (2) Cortese 50 (3) Jonas Folger  (Aprilia) & Zarco 42

Rugby union
Heineken Cup semi-finals:
Northampton Saints  23–7  Perpignan in Milton Keynes

Snooker
World Championship in Sheffield, England, final:
Judd Trump  10–7 John Higgins

Surfing
Women's World Tour:
Subaru Pro TSB Bank Women's Surf Festival at Taranaki, New Zealand: (1) Sally Fitzgibbons  (2) Carissa Moore  (3) Coco Ho  & Tyler Wright 
Standings (after 3 of 7 events): (1) Fitzgibbons 26,500 points (2) Moore 26,000 (3) Wright 19,700

Tennis
ATP World Tour:
BMW Open in Munich, Germany:
Final: Nikolay Davydenko  def. Florian Mayer  6–3, 3–6, 6–1
Davydenko wins the tournament for the second time, for the 21st title of his career.
Serbia Open in Belgrade, Serbia:
Final: Novak Djokovic  def. Feliciano López  7–6(4), 6–2
The tournament host wins his second Serbia Open title, fifth title of the season, and 23rd of his career. He also extends his season match record to 27–0.
Estoril Open in Estoril, Portugal:
Final: Juan Martín del Potro  def. Fernando Verdasco  6–2, 6–2
Del Potro wins his second title of the season, and the ninth of his career.

References

5